A comedian is one who entertains through comedy, such as jokes and other forms of humour.  Following is a list of comedians, comedy groups, and comedy writers.

Comedians
(sorted alphabetically by surname)

A

 Rose Abdoo (born 1962)
 Raymond Ablack (born 1989)
 John Aboud (born 1973)
 James Acaster (born 1985)
 Jayde Adams (born 1984)
 Kev Adams (born 1991)
 Pamela Adlon (born 1966)
 James Adomian (born 1980)
 Scott Adsit (born 1965)
 Steve Agee (born 1969)
 Alex Agnew (born 1973)
 Rubén Aguirre (1934–2016)
 Dan Ahdoot (born 1981)
 Caroline Aherne (1963-2016)
 Ahmed Ahmed (born 1970)
 Sohail Ahmed (born 1963)
 Franklyn Ajaye (born 1949)
 Anna Akana (born 1989)
 Malin Akerman (born 1978)
 Nawaal Akram (born 1990)
 Nasser Al Qasabi (born 1963)
 Joe Alaskey (1952–2016)
 Carlos Alazraqui (born 1962)
 Rory Albanese (born 1977)
 Lou Albano (1933-2009)
 Eddie Albert (1906-2005)
 Alan Alda (born 1936)
 Jason Alexander (born 1959)
 Ted Alexandro (born 1969)
 Barbara Jo Allen (1906–1974)
 Dave Allen (1936–2005)
 Gracie Allen (1895–1964)
 Leo Allen (born 1972)
 Marty Allen (1922–2018)
 Steve Allen (1921–2000)
 Tim Allen (born 1953)
 Woody Allen (born 1935)
 Kirstie Alley (born 1951)
 Kevin Allison (born 1970)
 Stephanie Allynne (born 1986)
 Cristela Alonzo (born 1979)
 Jeff Altman (born 1951)
 Brian Jordan Alvarez (born 1987)
 The Amazing Johnathan (1958–2022)
 Utkarsh Ambudkar (born 1983)
 Robbie Amell (born 1988)
 Mo Amer (born 1981)
 John Amos (born 1939)
 Megan Amram (born 1987)
 Simon Amstell (born 1979)
 Morey Amsterdam (1908–1996)
 Andrea Anders (born 1975)
 Siw Anita Andersen (born 1966)
 Amy Anderson (born 1972)
 Anthony Anderson (born 1970)
 Blake Anderson (born 1984)
 Harry Anderson (1952–2018)
 James Anderson
 Louie Anderson (1953–2022)
 Wil Anderson (born 1974)
 Eric André (born 1983)
 Alex Anfanger (born 1985)
 Michael Angarano (born 1987)
 Lucia Aniello (born 1983)
 Jennifer Aniston (born 1969)
 Aziz Ansari (born 1983)
 Ant (born 1967)
 Dave Anthony (born 1967)
 Craig Anton (born 1962)
 Judd Apatow (born 1967)
 Ingo Appelt (born 1967)
 Christina Applegate (born 1971)
 John Aprea (born 1941)
 Carly Aquilino (born 1990)
 Nicole Arbour (born 1985)
 Lisa Arch (born 1971)
 Roscoe "Fatty" Arbuckle (1887–1933)
 Geoffrey Arend (born 1978)
 Lesley Arfin (born 1979)
 Marcella Arguello (born 1985)
 Fred Armisen (born 1966)
 Alexander Armstrong (born 1970)
 Desi Arnaz (1917-1986)
 Will Arnett (born 1970)
 David A. Arnold (1968–2022)
 Tichina Arnold (born 1969)
 Tom Arnold (born 1959)
 David Arquette (born 1971)
 Bea Arthur (1922–2009)
 Aaron Aryanpur (born 1978)
 Katie Aselton (born 1978)
 Erica Ash (born 1977)
 Lauren Ash (born 1983)
 Arthur Askey (1900–1982)
 Ed Asner (1929-2021)
 Sean Astin (born 1971)
 Skylar Astin (born 1987)
 Emily Atack (born 1989)
 Anthony Atamanuik (born 1974)
 Aristotle Athari (born 1991)
 Rowan Atkinson (born 1955)
 Helen Atkinson-Wood (born 1955)
 Dave Attell (born 1965)
 Michael "Atters" Attree (born 1965)
 Scott Aukerman (born 1970)
 Phil Austin (1941–2015)
 Joe Avati (born 1974)
 Awkwafina (born 1988)
 Ayelet the Kosher Komic
 Dan Aykroyd (born 1952)
 Peter Aykroyd (1955–2021)
 Damali Ayo (born 1972)
 Richard Ayoade (born 1977)
 Hank Azaria (born 1964)
 Valerie Azlynn (born 1980)

B

 Baba Ali (born 1975)
 Dirk Bach (1961–2012)
 Diedrich Bader (born 1966)
 Max Baer Jr. (born 1937)
 Ross Bagley (born 1988)
 Tim Bagley (born 1957)
 Ben Bailey (born 1970)
 Bill Bailey (born 1964)
 Conrad Bain (1923-2013)
 Nick Bakay (born 1959)
 Bobbie Baker
 Leslie David Baker (born 1958)
 Rosebud Baker (born 1985)
 Sarah Baker
 Dan Bakkedahl (born 1969)
 Carlos Balá (1925–2022)
 Bob Balaban (born 1945)
 Josiane Balasko (born 1950)
 Hugo Egon Balder (born 1950)
 Alec Baldwin (born 1958)
 Lucille Ball (1911–1989)
 Kaye Ballard (1925-2019)
 Tom Ballard (born 1989)
 Colleen Ballinger (born 1986)
 Tim Baltz
 Maria Bamford (born 1970)
 Eric Bana (born 1968)
 Elizabeth Banks (born 1974)
 Morwenna Banks (born 1961)
 Edward Barbanell (born 1977)
 Andrea Barber (born 1976)
 Celeste Barber (born 1982)
 Nate Bargatze (born 1979)
 Robert Baril (born 1986/1987)
 Ike Barinholtz (born 1977)
 Jon Barinholtz (born 1982)
 Arj Barker (born 1974)
 Ronnie Barker (1929–2005)
 Angela Barnes (born 1976)
 Ty Barnett (born 1975)
 Vince Barnett (1902–1977)
 Sandy Baron (1937–2001)
 Roseanne Barr (born 1952)
 Julian Barratt (born 1968)
 Kenya Barris (born 1974)
 Carl Barron (born 1968)
 Todd Barry (born 1964)
 Drew Barrymore (born 1975)
 Mario Barth (born 1972)
 Justin Bartha (born 1978)
 Jay Baruchel (born 1982)
 Frank-Markus Barwasser (born 1960)
 Jason Bateman (born 1969)
 Angelique Bates (born 1980)
 David Batra (born 1972)
 Brian Baumgartner (born 1972)
 Eric Bauza (born 1979)
 Stanley Baxter (born 1926)
 Vanessa Bayer (born 1981)
 Matthew Baynton (born 1980)
 Carter Bays (born 1975)
 Aisling Bea (born 1984)
 Allyce Beasley (born 1954)
 Anne Beatts (1947–2021)
 David Beck  (born 1970)
 Alison Becker (born 1977)
 Jürgen Becker (born 1959)
 Rob Beckett (born 1986)
 Samantha Bee (born 1969)
 Joy Behar (born 1942)
 Greg Behrendt (born 1963)
 Beth Behrs (born 1985)
 Jillian Bell (born 1984)
 Lake Bell (born 1979)
 Tone Bell (born 1983)
 W. Kamau Bell (born 1973)
 Bill Bellamy (born 1965)
 Ryan Belleville (born 1979)
 Jim Belushi (born 1954)
 John Belushi (1949–1982)
 Richard Belzer (1944–2023)
 Bea Benaderet (1906–1968)
 H. Jon Benjamin (born 1966)
 Owen Benjamin (born 1980)
 Beck Bennett (born 1984)
 Ron Bennington (born 1958)
 D.C. Benny
 Jack Benny (1894–1974)
 Doug Benson (born 1964)
 Alec Berg
 Edgar Bergen (1903–1978)
 Peter Paul Bergman (1939–2012)
 Kate Berlant (born 1987)
 Milton Berle (1908–2002)
 Shelley Berman (1925–2017)
 Sandra Bernhard (born 1955)
 Matt Berry (born 1974)
 Joe Besser (1907–1988)
 Matt Besser (born 1967)
 Ilka Bessin (born 1971)
 Danny Bhoy (born 1976)
 Mayim Bialik (born 1975)
 Leslie Bibb (born 1974)
 Jason Biggs (born 1978)
 Mike Birbiglia (born 1978)
 Simon Bird (born 1984)
 Mary Birdsong (born 1968)
 Des Bishop (born 1975)
 Joey Bishop (1918–2007)
 John Bishop (born 1966)
 Kevin Bishop (born 1980)
 Ashley Nicole Black (born 1985)
 Jack Black (born 1969)
 Jordan Black (born 1970)
 Lewis Black (born 1948)
 Michael Ian Black (born 1971)
 Michael Blackson (born 1972)
 Hamish Blake (born 1981)
 Mel Blanc (1908–1989)
 Maria Blasucci (born 1986)
 Rich Blomquist (born 1977)
 Rachel Bloom (born 1987)
 Ben Blue (1901–1975)
 Josh Blue (born 1978)
 Sarayu Blue (born 1975)
 Amir Blumenfeld (born 1983)
 John Bluthal (1929-2018)
 Raphael Bob-Waksberg (born 1984)
 Alonzo Bodden (born 1967)
 Steve Bodow
 Mirja Boes (born 1971)
 Catherine Bohart (born 1988)
 Danny Bonaduce (born 1959)
 Peter Bonerz (born 1938)
 Wigald Boning (born 1967)
 Sonny Bono (1935-1998)
 Elayne Boosler (born 1952)
 Joel Kim Booster (born 1988)
 Tato Bores (1927–1996)
 Flula Borg (born 1982)
 Victor Borge (1909–2000)
 Kyle Bornheimer (born 1975)
 Alex Borstein (born 1971)
 Loren Bouchard (born 1969)
 Lilan Bowden (born 1985)
 Andrew Bowen (born 1972)
 Julie Bowen (born 1970)
 Byron Bowers
 John Ross Bowie (born 1971)
 Max Boyce (born 1945)
 Frankie Boyle (born 1972)
 Peter Boyle (1935–2006)
 Fern Brady
 Wayne Brady (born 1972)
 Harriet Braine
 Joey Bragg (born 1996)
 Patrick Brammall (born 1976)
 Jo Brand (born 1957)
 Russell Brand (born 1975)
 Betsy Brandt (born 1973)
 Guy Branum  (born 1975)
 John Branyan (born 1965) 
 Matt Braunger (born 1974)
 Kurt Braunohler (born 1976)
 Daniel Breaker (born 1980)
 El Brendel (1890–1964)
 Josh Brener (born 1984)
 Kevin Brennan (born 1960)
 Neal Brennan (born 1974)
 David Brenner (1936–2014)
 Jim Breuer (born 1967)
 Paget Brewster (born 1969)
 Alison Brie (born 1982)
 Joe Bob Briggs (born 1953)
 Patrick Bristow (born 1962)
 Janine Brito
 Paul Brittain (born 1977)
 Doug Brochu (born 1990)
 Matthew Broderick (born 1962)
 Adam Brody (born 1979)
 Jimmy Brogan (born 1948)
 Albert Brooks (born 1947)
 Foster Brooks (1912–2001)
 James L. Brooks (born 1940)
 Max Brooks (born 1972)
 Mel Brooks (born 1926)
 Brother Theodore (1906–2001)
 Alan Brough (born 1967)
 A. Whitney Brown (born 1952)
 Alton Brown (born 1962)
 Clancy Brown (born 1959)
 Joe E. Brown (1891–1973)
 Kevin Brown (born 1972)
 Wally Brown (1904–1961)
 Cocoa Brown (born 1972)
 Yvette Nicole Brown (born 1971)
 Carrie Brownstein (born 1974)
 Lenny Bruce (1925–1966)
 Hazel Brugger (born 1993)
 Quinta Brunson (born 1989)
 Aidy Bryant (born 1987)
 Rob Brydon (born 1965)
 Andy Buckley (born 1965)
 James Buckley (born 1987)
 Jim J. Bullock (born 1955)
 Vicco von Bülow (1923–2011)
 Rodger Bumpass (born 1951)
 Michael Bunin (born 1970)
 John Bunny (1863–1915)
 Hannibal Buress (born 1983)
 Tituss Burgess (born 1979)
 Delta Burke (born 1956)
 Kathy Burke (born 1964)
 Carol Burnett (born 1933)
 Bo Burnham (born 1990)
 Burnie Burns (born 1973)
 George Burns (1896–1996)
 Jack Burns (1933–2020)
 Regan Burns (born 1968)
 Sarah Burns (born 1981)
 Bill Burr (born 1968)
 Maryedith Burrell (born 1952)
 Ty Burrell (born 1967)
 Abe Burrows (1910–1985)
 James Burrows (born 1940)
 Steve Buscemi (born 1957)
 Adam Busch (born 1978)
 River Butcher (born 1982)
 Michelle Buteau (born 1977) 
 Brett Butler (born 1958)
 Red Buttons (1919–2006)
 Adam Buxton (born 1969)
 Ruth Buzzi (born 1936)
 Nicole Byer (born 1986)
 John Byner (born 1938)
 Amanda Bynes (born 1986)
 Ed Byrne (born 1972)
 Jason Byrne (born 1972)
 Rose Byrne (born 1979)
 Steve Byrne (born 1974)

C

 Louis C.K. (born 1967)
 Vladimir Caamaño (born 1979)
 Angelique Cabral (born 1979)
 Liz Cackowski
 Sid Caesar (1922–2014)
 Frank Caeti (born 1973)
 Frank Caliendo (born 1975)
 Charlie Callas (1924–2011)
 Bryan Callen (born 1967)
 Frances Callier (born 1969)
 Rhona Cameron (born 1965)
 Adam Campbell (born 1980)
 Archie Campbell (1914–1987)
 Bruce Campbell (born 1958)
 Craig Campbell (born 1969)
 Heather Anne Campbell
 Larry Joe Campbell (born 1970)
 Neil Campbell 
 Tisha Campbell (born 1968)
 John Candy (1950–1994)
 Bobby Cannavale (born 1970)
 Kay Cannon (born 1974)
 Nick Cannon (born 1980)
 Mario Cantone (born 1959)
 John Caparulo (born 1975)
 Blaine Capatch (born 1965)
 Lizzy Caplan (born 1982)
 Scott Capurro (born 1962)
 Matty Cardarople (born 1983)
 Linda Cardellini (born 1975)
 D'Arcy Carden (born 1980)
 Nancy Carell (born 1966)
 Steve Carell (born 1962)
 Drew Carey (born 1958)
 Maggie Carey (born 1975)
 George Carlin (1937–2008)
 Jordan Carlos (born 1978)
 Urzila Carlson (born 1976)
 Jerrod Carmichael (born 1987)
 Alan Carney (1909–1973)
 Art Carney (1918–2003)
 Adam Carolla (born 1964)
 Alan Carr (born 1976)
 Jimmy Carr (born 1972)
 Jim Carrey (born 1962)
 Rodney Carrington (born 1968)
 Pat Carroll (1927-2022)
 Carrot Top (Scott Thompson) (born 1965)
 Jasper Carrott (born 1945)
 Johnny Carson (1925–2005)
 Nancy Cartwright (born 1957)
 Dana Carvey (born 1955)
 Neil Casey (born 1981)
 Aya Cash (born 1982)
 Cliff Cash (born 1981)
 Craig Cash (born 1960)
 Michael Cassidy (born 1983)
 Dan Castellaneta (born 1957)
 Mike Castle (born 1989)
 Roy Castle (1932–1994)
 Arturo Castro (born 1985)
 Jade Catta-Preta
 Walter Catlett (1889–1960)
 John Catucci (born 1973)
 Jo Caulfield (born 1965)
 Tony Cavalero (born 1983)
 Elise Cavanna (1902-1963)
 Dick Cavett (born 1936)
 Adam Cayton-Holland (born 1980)
 Kyle Cease (born 1977)
 Cedric The Entertainer (born 1964)
 Wyatt Cenac (born 1976)
 Michael Cera (born 1988)
 Bülent Ceylan (born 1976)
 Jessica Chaffin (born 1982)
 Rachel Chagall (born 1952)
 Sarah Chalke (born 1976)
 Kevin Chamberlin (born 1963)
 Emma Chambers (1964–2018)
 Jackie Chan (born 1954)
 Melanie Chandra (born 1984)
 Jay Chandrasekhar (born 1968)
 Carol Channing (1921–2019)
 Jay Chanoine (born 1986/1987)
 Zoë Chao (born 1985)
 Omar Chaparro (born 1974)
 Charlie Chaplin (1889–1977)
 Graham Chapman (1941–1989)
 Doug Chappel (born 1975)
 Dave Chappelle (born 1973)
 Charlamagne tha God (born 1978)
 Craig Charles (born 1964)
 Josh Charles (born 1971)
 Charo
 Melanie Chartoff (born 1948)
 Charley Chase (1893–1940)
 Chevy Chase (born 1943)
 Michael Che (born 1983)
 Karen Chee (born 1995)
 Parvesh Cheena (born 1979)
 Richard Cheese (born 1965)
 Kristin Chenoweth (born 1968)
 Zach Cherry (born 1987)
 Cherry Chevapravatdumrong (born 1977)
 Ronny Chieng (born 1985)
 Autumn Chiklis (born 1993)
 Michael Chiklis (born 1963)
 Chingo Bling (Pedro Herrera) (born 1979)
 Nasir Chinyoti (born 1970)
 Ted Chippington (born 1960)
 Whitney Chitwood
 Henry Cho (born 1962)
 John Cho (born 1972)
 Margaret Cho (born 1968)
 Jessica Chobot (born 1977)
 Tommy Chong (born 1938)
 Bill Chott (born 1969)
 Stephen Chow (born 1962)
 Paul Chowdhry (born 1974)
 Bridget Christie (born 1971)
 Papa CJ (born 1977)
 Anthony Clark (born 1964)
 Bobby Clark (1888–1960)
 Laurence Clark (born 1974)
 Mystro Clark (born 1966)
 Lenny Clarke (born 1953)
 Julian Clary (born 1959)
 Andrew "Dice" Clay (born 1958)
 John Cleese (born 1939)
 Ellen Cleghorne (born 1965)
 Jemaine Clement (born 1974)
 Sean Clements (born 1981)
 Del Close (1934-1999)
 Jerry Clower (1926–1998)
 Andy Clyde (1892–1967)
 Michaela Coel (born 1987)
 Andy Cohen (born 1968)
 Catherine Cohen (born 1991)
 Sacha Baron Cohen (born 1971)
 Mindy Cohn (born 1966)
 Diablo Cody (born 1978)
 Sherry Cola (born 1989)
 Enrico Colantoni (born 1963)
 Stephen Colbert (born 1964)
 Coldmirror (born 1984)
 Deon Cole (born 1972)
 Kim Coles (born 1962)
 Gary Coleman (1968–2010)
 Jonathan Coleman (1956–2021)
 Kelen Coleman (born 1984)
 Ryan Coleman (born 1991)
 Kim Coles (born 1966)
 Bobby Collins (born 1951) 
 Michelle Collins (born 1981)
 Misha Collins (born 1974)
 Mo Collins (born 1965)
 Sarah Colonna (born 1974)
 Michael Colton (born 1975)
 Robbie Coltrane (1950–2022)
 Ray Combs (1956–1996)
 Pat Condell (born 1949)
 Frank Conniff (born 1956)
 Billy Connolly (born 1942)
 Kevin Connolly (born 1974)
 Adam Conover (born 1983)
 Carlo Conti (born 1961)
 Nina Conti (born 1974)
 Tim Conway (1933–2019)
 Steve Coogan (born 1965)
 Dane Cook (born 1972)
 David L. Cook (born 1968)
 Matt Cook (born 1984)
 Peter Cook (1937–1995)
 Josh Cooke (born 1979)
 Danny Cooksey (born 1975)
 Jennifer Coolidge (born 1961)
 Bradley Cooper (born 1975)
 Pat Cooper (born 1929)
 Sarah Cooper (born 1977)
 Tommy Cooper (1921–1984)
 Alicia Coppola (born 1968)
 Bill Corbett (born 1960)
 Ronnie Corbett (1930–2016)
 Nate Corddry (born 1977)
 Rob Corddry (born 1971)
 James Corden (born 1978)
 Eugene Cordero
 Professor Irwin Corey (1914–2017)
 Joe Cornish (born 1968)
 Rebecca Corry (born 1971)
 Bud Cort
 Bill Cosby (born 1937)
 Lou Costello (1906–1959)
 Sue Costello (born 1968)
 Camille Cottin (born 1978)
 Dave Coulier (born 1959)
 Jonathan Coulton (born 1970)
 Eliza Coupe (born 1981)
 Stephanie Courtney (born 1970)
 Allen Covert (born 1964)
 Courteney Cox (born 1964)
 Wally Cox (1924–1973)
 Carly Craig (born 1980)
 Lavell Crawford (born 1968)
 Zach Cregger (born 1980)
 Amanda Crew (born 1986)
 Terry Crews (born 1968)
 Chelsey Crisp (born 1983)
 John Crist (born 1984)
 Affion Crockett (born 1974)
 Ben Crompton (born 1974)
 Mackenzie Crook (born 1971)
 Norm Crosby (1927–2020)
 David Cross (born 1964)
 Lucas Cruikshank (born 1993)
 Hal Cruttenden (born 1969)
 Barry Cryer (1935–2022)
 Jon Cryer (born 1965)
 Billy Crystal (born 1948)
 Ice Cube (born 1969)
 Seán Cullen (born 1965)
 Whitney Cummings (born 1982)
 Dan Cummins (born 1977)
 James Cunningham (born 1973)
 Kaley Cuoco (born 1985)
 Mark Curry (born 1961)
 Stephen Curry (born 1976)
 Jane Curtin (born 1947)
 Joan Cusack (born 1962)
 John Cusack (born 1966)

D

 Peter F. Dailey (1868–1908)
 Charlie Dale (1885–1971)
 Karl Dall (1941–2020)
 John Francis Daley (born 1985)
 Andrew Daly (born 1971)
 Jon Daly
 Tim Daly (born 1956)
 Bill Dana (1924–2017)
 Rodney Dangerfield (1921–2004)
 Chad Daniels (born 1975)
 Greg Daniels (born 1963)
 Ted Danson (born 1947)
 Dante (born 1970)
 Tony Danza (born 1951)
 Khalid Abbas Dar (born 1955)
 Rhys Darby (born 1974)
 Severn Darden (1929–1995)
 Vir Das (born 1979)
 Hayes Davenport (born 1986)
 Jim David (born 1954)
 Larry David (born 1947)
 Dov Davidoff (born 1973)
 Hugh Davidson
 Jim Davidson (born 1953)
 Pete Davidson (born 1993)
 Alan Davies (born 1966)
 Greg Davies (born 1968)
 DeRay Davis (born 1982)
 Jeff B. Davis (born 1973)
 Julia Davis (born 1966)
 Kristin Davis (born 1965)
 LaVan Davis (born 1966)
 Lucy Davis (born 1973)
 Matt Davis (born 1979)
 Tanyalee Davis (born 1970)
 Tom Davis (1952–2012)
 Richard Dawson (1932–2012)
 Les Dawson (1931–1993)
 Shane Dawson (born 1988)
 Charlie Day (born 1976)
 Dennis Day (1916-1988)
 Felicia Day (born 1979)
 Mikey Day (born 1980)
 Andy de la Tour (born 1954)
 Frank DeCaro (born 1962)
 Gerry Dee (born 1968)
 Jack Dee (born 1962) 
 Rob Deering (born 1972)
 Eddie Deezen (born 1957)
 Ellen DeGeneres (born 1958)
 Vance DeGeneres (born 1954)
 Neil Delamere (born 1980)
 Rob Delaney (born 1977)
 Lea DeLaria (born 1958)
 Jessica Delfino (born 1976)
 Chris D'Elia (born 1980)
 Grey DeLisle (born 1973)
 Bianca Del Rio (born 1975)
 David DeLuise (born 1971)
 Dom DeLuise (1933–2009)
 Ivor Dembina (born 1951)
 Dr. Demento (born 1941)
 Jamie Demetriou (born 1987)
 Natasia Demetriou (born 1984)
 Lori Beth Denberg (born 1976)
 Jamie Denbo (born 1973)
 Kat Dennings (born 1986)
 Gabrielle Dennis (born 1981)
 Hugh Dennis (born 1962)
 Les Dennis (born 1953)
 Joe DeRita (1909–1993)
 Joe DeRosa (born 1977)
 Portia de Rossi (born 1973)
 Zooey Deschanel (born 1980)
 Jack DeSena (born 1987)
 Mike DeStefano (1966–2011)
 Adam DeVine (born 1983)
 Danny DeVito (born 1944)
 Tommy Dewey (born 1978)
 Eugenio Derbez (born 1962)
 Dustin Diamond (1977–2021)
 Chris Diamantopoulos (born 1975)
 Cameron Diaz (born 1972)
 Joey Diaz (born 1963)
 Vic Dibitetto (born 1961)
 Andy Dick (born 1965)
 Daniel Dickey (born 1986)
 John Di Domenico (born 1962)
 Dominic Dierkes (born 1984)
 Richard Digance (born 1949)
 Debra DiGiovanni
 Phyllis Diller (1917–2012)
 Brooke Dillman (born 1966)
 Kevin Dillon (born 1965)
 Tim Dillon (born 1985)
 John DiMaggio (born 1968)
 Amelia Dimoldenberg (born 1994)
 Paul Dinello (born 1962)
 Juan Pablo Di Pace (born 1979)
 Nick DiPaolo (born 1962)
 Katie Dippold (born 1980)
 Andrew Dismukes (born 1995)
 Chris Distefano (born 1984)
 Olli Dittrich (born 1956)
 Gina DiVittorio (born 1995)
 Omid Djalili (born 1965)
 Anh Do (born 1977)
 David Dobrik (born 1996)
 Nik Dodani (born 1994)
 Ken Dodd (1927–2018)
 Mark Dolan (born 1974)
 Paul Dooley (born 1928)
 Kether Donohue (born 1985)
 Lisa Donovan (born 1980)
 Tate Donovan (born 1963)
 Jimmy Dore (born 1965)
 Jon Dore (born 1975)
 Doug E. Doug (born 1970)
 Beth Dover (born 1978)
 John Dowie (born 1950)
 Jim Downey (born 1952)
 Paul W. Downs (born 1982)
 Brian Doyle-Murray (born 1945)
 Charlie Drake (1925–2006)
 Larry Drake (1949–2016)
 Ruth Draper (1884–1956)
 Rachel Dratch (born 1966)
 Fran Drescher (born 1957)
 Marie Dressler (1868–1934)
 James Dreyfus (born 1968)
 Anna Drezen
 Drew Droege
 Mike Drucker (born 1984)
 Eric Drysdale (born 1969)
 Rebecca Drysdale (born 1978/1979)
 Rick Ducommun (1952–2015)
 Dennis Dugan (born 1946)
 Christian Duguay (born 1970)
 Josh Duhamel (born 1972)
 Jean Dujardin (born 1972)
 Clark Duke (born 1985)
 Robin Duke (born 1954)
 Ryan Drummond (born 1973)
 Sandy Duncan (born 1946)
 Shane Dundas (born 1959)
 Jeff Dunham (born 1962)
 Lena Dunham (born 1986)
 Barbara Dunkelman (born 1989)
 Colton Dunn (born 1977)
 Gabe Dunn (born 1988)
 Jimmy Dunn
 Nora Dunn (born 1952)
 Ryan Dunn (1977–2011)
 Kyle Dunnigan (born 1971)
 Jay Duplass (born 1973)
 Mark Duplass (born 1976)
 Elvis Duran (born 1964)
 Jimmy Durante (1893–1980)
 Sanjay Dutt (born 1959)
 Clea DuVall (born 1977)
 Shelley Duvall (born 1949)
 Bil Dwyer (born 1962)
 Jeff Dye (born 1983)
Jeremy Dyson (born 1966)

E

 Open Mike Eagle (born 1980)
 Jason Earles (born 1977)
 John Early (born 1988)
 Christine Ebersole (born 1953)
 Chris Eckert (born 1986)
 Costaki Economopoulos (born 1965)
 Ayo Edebiri (born 1995)
 Alex Edelman (born 1989)
 Eric Edelstein (born 1977)
 Ade Edmondson (born 1957)
 Dean Edwards (born 1970)
 Derek Edwards (born 1958)
 Ian Edwards
 Christian Ehring (born 1972)
 Billy Eichner (born 1978)
 Hannah Einbinder (born 1995)
 Bob Einstein (1942–2019)
 Rich Eisen (born 1969)
 Ophira Eisenberg (born 1972)
 Naomi Ekperigin
 Kevin Eldon (born 1959)
 Laurie Elliot (born 1971)
 Abby Elliott (born 1987)
 Bob Elliott (1923–2016)
 Bridey Elliott (born 1990)
 Chris Elliott (born 1960)
 Mary Elizabeth Ellis (born 1979)
 Gad Elmaleh (born 1971)
 Ethan Embry (born 1978)
 Dick Emery (1915–1983)
 Harry Enfield (born 1961)
 Anke Engelke (born 1965)
 Bill Engvall (born 1957)
 John Ennis 
 Mike Epps (born 1970)
 Molly Erdman (born 1974)
 Heinz Erhardt (1909–1979)
 Paco Erhard (born 1975)
 Andy Erikson (born 1987)
 Leon Errol (1881–1951)
 Maya Erskine (born 1987)
 Cole Escola (born 1986)
 Ennis Esmer (born 1978)
 Felipe Esparza (born 1970)
 Cameron Esposito (born 1981) 
 Charles Esten (born 1965)
 Chris Evans (born 1966)
 Lee Evans (born 1964)
 Sean Evans (born 1986)
 Bridget Everett (born 1972)
 Kenny Everett (1944–1995)
 Justine Ezarick (born 1984)

F

 Ana Fabrega (born 1991)
 Josh Fadem (born 1980)
 Bill Fagerbakke (born 1957)
 Damien Fahey (born 1980)
 Donald Faison (born 1974)
 Jimmy Fallon (born 1974)
 Simon Fanshawe (born 1956)
 Ali Farahnakian (born 1967)
 Anna Faris (born 1976)
 Chris Farley (1964–1997)
 John Farley (born 1968)
 Kevin Farley (born 1965)
 Bill Farmer (born 1952)
 Simon Farnaby (born 1973)
 Jamie Farr (born 1934)
 Bobby Farrelly (born 1958)
 Peter Farrelly (born 1956)
 Negin Farsad (born 1978)
 Mitch Fatel (born 1968)
 Jon Favreau (born 1966)
 Nat Faxon (born 1975)
 Isabel Fay (born 1979)
 Joey Faye
 Helga Feddersen (1930–1990)
 Wayne Federman (born 1959)
 Paul Feig (born 1962)
 Fortune Feimster (born 1980)
 Rachel Feinstein 
 Ben Feldman (born 1980)
 David Feldman
 Liz Feldman (born 1977)
 Marty Feldman (1934–1982)
 Beanie Feldstein (born 1993)
 Graham Fellowes (born 1959)
 Randy Feltface (born 1980)
 Spike Feresten (born 1964)
 Craig Ferguson (born 1962)
 Don Ferguson (born 1946)
 Jay R. Ferguson (born 1974)
 Jesse Tyler Ferguson (born 1975)
 Keith Ferguson (born 1972)
 Shelby Fero (born 1993)
 Adam Ferrara (born 1966)
 Jerry Ferrara (born 1979)
 Will Ferrell (born 1967)
 Herbert Feuerstein (1937–2020)
 Tina Fey (born 1970)
 Nathan Fielder (born 1983)
 Noel Fielding (born 1973)
 Totie Fields (1930–1978)
 W. C. Fields (1880–1946)
 Nathan Fillion (born 1971)
 Larry Fine (1902–1975)
 Chloe Fineman (born 1988)
 Christian Finnegan (born 1973)
 Kathryn Fiore (born 1979)
 Jo Firestone (born 1987)
 Jordan Firstman (born 1991)
 Jenna Fischer (born 1974)
 Joely Fisher (born 1967)
 Lang Fisher (born 1980)
 Greg Fitzsimmons (born 1966)
 Fannie Flagg (born 1944)
 Joe Flaherty (born 1941)
 Crista Flanagan (born 1976)
 Tom Flanigan
 Kate Flannery (born 1964)
 Charles Fleischer (born 1950)
 Chris Fleming (born 1987)
 Jim Florentine (born 1964)
 Jake Flores
 Neil Flynn (born 1960)
 Jake Fogelnest (born 1979)
 Dan Fogler (born 1976)
 Lisa Foiles (born 1986)   
 Dave Foley (born 1963)
 Mick Foley (born 1965)
 Paul Foot (born 1973)
 Faith Ford (born 1964)
 Thomas Mikal Ford (1964–2016)
 Matt Forde (born 1982)
 Joey Forman (1929–1982)
 George Formby (1904–1961)
 George Formby, Sr. (1875–1921)
 Will Forte (born 1970)
 Kat Foster (born 1978)
 Jermaine Fowler (born 1988)
 Kirk Fox (born 1969)
 Michael J. Fox (born 1961)
 Zack Fox (born 1990)
 Jeff Foxworthy (born 1958)
 Jamie Foxx (born 1967)
 Redd Foxx (1922–1991)
 Leigh Francis (born 1974)
 Stewart Francis (born 1964)
 Pablo Francisco (born 1974)
 Dave Franco (born 1985)
 Eduardo Franco (born 1995)
 James Franco (born 1978)
 Al Franken (born 1951)
 Marina Franklin
 Nelson Franklin (born 1985)
 Daniel Franzese (born 1978)
 Alice Fraser
 William Frawley (1887–1966)
 Stan Freberg (1926–2015)
 Gavin Free (born 1988)
 Travon Free (born 1985)
 Martin Freeman (born 1971)
 Dawn French (born 1957)
 Matt Frewer (born 1958)
 Judah Friedlander (born 1969)
 Will Friedle (born 1976)
 Budd Friedman (1932–2022)
 Jena Friedman
 Annette Frier (born 1974)
 Leon Frierson (born 1986)
 Don Friesen
 Freddie Frinton (1909–1968)
 Rebecca Front (born 1964)
 David Frost (1939–2013)
 Nick Frost (born 1972)
 Stephen Fry (born 1957)
 Soleil Moon Frye (born 1976)
 Pamela Fryman (born 1959)
 Daisy Fuentes (born 1966)
 John Fugelsang (born 1969)
 Rich Fulcher (born 1968)
 Ned Fulmer (born 1987)
 Ziwe Fumudoh (born 1992)
 Ron Funches (born 1983)
 Brittany Furlan (born 1986)
 Fakkah Fuzz (born 1986)

G

 Eva Gabor (1919-1995)
 Jon Gabrus (born 1982)
 Josh Gad (born 1981)
 Hannah Gadsby (born 1978)
 Jim Gaffigan (born 1966)
 Mo Gaffney (born 1958)
 Daniele Gaither (born 1970)
 Johnny Galecki (born 1975)
 Zach Galifianakis (born 1969)
 Gallagher (1946–2022)
 Brian Gallivan
 Ed Gamble (born 1986)
 Megan Ganz (born 1984)
 Robert Ben Garant (born 1970)
 Jorge Garcia (born 1973)
 Billy Gardell (born 1969)
 Graeme Garden (born 1943)
 Brother Dave Gardner (1926–1983)
 Heidi Gardner (born 1983)
 Pete Gardner
 Tony Gardner (born 1964)
 Jeff Garlin (born 1962)
 Ralph Garman (born 1964)
 Paul Garner (1909–2004)
 Janeane Garofalo (born 1964)
 Teri Garr (born 1944)
 Brad Garrett (born 1960)
 Kyle Gass (born 1960)
 Ana Gasteyer (born 1967)
 Alison Gates (born 1988/1989)
 Kimmy Gatewood
 Mark Gatiss (born 1966)
 Joe Gatto (born 1976)
 Ryan Gaul (born 1973)
 Richard Gautier (1931–2017)
 Joey Gay (born 1971)
 George Gaynes (1917-2016)
 Dustin Gee (1942–1986)
 Chris Geere (born 1981)
 Brett Gelman (born 1976)
 John Gemberling (born 1981)
 Tom Gerhardt (born 1957)
 Ricky Gervais (born 1961)
 Chris Gethard (born 1980)
 Estelle Getty (1923–2008)
 Tom Gianas
 Marla Gibbs (born 1931)
 Erin Gibson
 Kathie Lee Gifford (born 1953)
 Billy Gilbert (1894–1971)
 Rhod Gilbert (born 1968)
 Russell Gilbert (born 1959)
 Sara Gilbert (born 1975)
 Kevin Gillese (born 1980)
 Terry Gilliam (born 1940)
 Mo Gilligan (born 1988)
 Shane Gillis (born 1987)
 Paul Gilmartin (born 1963)
 Greg Giraldo (1965–2010)
 Adele Givens (born 1960)
 Jon Glaser (born 1968)
 Nikki Glaser (born 1984)
 Ira Glass (born 1959)
 Todd Glass (born 1964)
 Ilana Glazer (born 1987)
 Jackie Gleason (1916–1987)
 Tom Gleeson (born 1974)
 Ben Gleib (born 1978)
 Donald Glover (born 1983)
 GloZell (born 1972)
 George Gobel (1919–1991)
 Godfrey (born 1969)
 Janey Godley (born 1961)
 Paul Goebel (born 1968)
 Loyiso Gola (born 1983)
 Judy Gold (born 1962)
 Adam Goldberg (born 1970)
 Adam F. Goldberg (born 1976)
 Andrew Goldberg (born 1978)
 Evan Goldberg (born 1982)
 Whoopi Goldberg (born 1955)
 Brett Goldstein (born 1980)
 Jonathan Goldstein (born 1968)
 Bobcat Goldthwait (born 1962)
 Ian Gomez (born 1965)
 Roberto Gómez Bolaños (Chespirito) (1929–2014)
 Josh Gondelman (born 1985)
 Jami Gong (born 1969)
 Ginger Gonzaga (born 1983)
 Cuba Gooding Jr. (born 1968)
 Omar Gooding (born 1976)
 John Goodman (born 1952)
 Ken Goodwin (1933–2012)
 Dan Goor (born 1975)
 Leo Gorcey (1917–1969)
 Joseph Gordon-Levitt (born 1981)
 Christopher Gorham (born 1974)
 Dave Gorman (born 1971)
 Frank Gorshin (1933–2005)
 Freeman Gosden (1899–1982)
 Mark-Paul Gosselaar (born 1974)
 Gilbert Gottfried (1955–2022)
 Theodore Gottlieb (1906–2001)
 Dana Gould (born 1964)
 Ray Goulding (1922–1990)
 Luba Goy (born 1945)
 Topher Grace (born 1978)
 Boothby Graffoe (born 1962)
 Heather Graham (born 1970)
 Matt Graham
 Kelsey Grammer (born 1955)
 Charlie Grandy (born 1974)
 Corinne Grant (born 1973)
 Stephen Grant (born 1973)
 Judy Graubart (born 1943)
 Ari Graynor (born 1983)
 Jeff Green (born 1964)
 Seth Green (born 1974)
 Tom Green (born 1971)
 Bryan Greenberg (born 1978)
 Shecky Greene (born 1926)
 Max Greenfield (born 1979)
 Kathy Greenwood (born 1962)
 Judy Greer (born 1975)
 Melvin Gregg (born 1988)
 Dick Gregory (1932–2017)
 James Gregory (born 1946)
 Tamsin Greig (born 1966)
 Adrian Grenier (born 1976)
 Stacey Grenrock-Woods (born 1975)
 David Alan Grier (born 1955)
 Erik Griffin  (born ?)
 Eddie Griffin (born 1968)
 Kathy Griffin (born 1960)
 Andy Griffith (1926–2012)
 Scott Grimes (born 1971)
 Todd Grinnell (born 1976)
 Charles Grodin (1935–2021)
 David Groh (1939–2008)
 Kirsten Gronfield (born 1977)
 Mary Gross (born 1953)
 Michael Gross (born 1947)
 Peter Grosz (born 1974)
 Rene Gube
 Matthew Gray Gubler (born 1980)
 Matt Groening (born 1954)
 Christopher Guest (born 1948)
 Patty Guggenheim (born 1984)
 Harvey Guillen (born 1990)
 Gary Gulman (born 1970)
 Appurv Gupta (born 1990)
 Broti Gupta (born 1993)
 Annabelle Gurwitch (born 1961)
 Björn Gustafsson (born 1986)
 Greg Gutfeld (born 1964)
 Steve Guttenberg (born 1958)
 Deryck Guyler (1914–1999)
 Ewen Gilmour (1963–2014)

H

 Buddy Hackett (1924–2003)
 Tiffany Haddish (born 1979)
 Bill Hader (born 1978)
 Jenny Hagel
 Hallie Haglund (born 1982)
 Meredith Hagner (born 1987)
 Kathryn Hahn (born 1973)
 Tony Hale (born 1970)
 Brian Haley (born 1961)
 Brad Hall (born 1958)
 Brandon Micheal Hall (born 1993)
 Daheli Hall (born 1976)
 Huntz Hall (1919–1999)
 Rich Hall (born 1954)
 Dieter Hallervorden (born 1935)
 Evelyn Hamann (1942–2007)
 Neil Hamburger (born 1967)
 Argus Hamilton
 Lloyd Hamilton (1891–1935)
 Ryan Hamilton (born 1976)
 Jon Hamm (born 1971)
 Darrell Hammond (born 1955)
 Nick Hancock (born 1962)
 Tony Hancock (1924–1968)
 Jack Handey (born 1949)
 Chelsea Handler (born 1975)
 Colin Hanks (born 1977)
 Tom Hanks (born 1956) 
 Alyson Hannigan (born 1974)
 Ryan Hansen (born 1981)
 Malcolm Hardee (1950–2005)
 Mike Harding (born 1944)
 Chris Hardwick (born 1971)
 Jeremy Hardy (1961–2019)
 Oliver Hardy (1890–1957)
 Allana Harkin
 Otis Harlan (1865–1940)
 Dan Harmon (born 1973)
 Tim Harmston (born 1971/1972)
 Valerie Harper (1939–2019)
 William Jackson Harper (born 1980)
 Neil Patrick Harris (born 1973)
 Rachael Harris (born 1968) 
 Robin Harris (1953–1990)
 Blake Harrison (born 1985)
 Bret Harrison (born 1982)
 Patti Harrison (born 1990)
 Hannah Hart (born 1986)
 Kevin Hart (born 1979)
 Mamrie Hart (born 1983)
 Melissa Joan Hart (born 1976)
 Miranda Hart (born 1972)
 Adam Hartle (born 1979)
 Phil Hartman (1948–1998)
 Steve Harvey (born 1957)
 Murtaza Hassan (1965–2011)
 Paul Walter Hauser (born 1986)
 Allan Havey (born 1954)
 Kali Hawk (born 1986)
 Tim Hawkins (born 1968)
 Tony Hawks (born 1960)
 Goldie Hawn (born 1945)
 Charles Hawtrey (1858–1923)
 Charles Hawtrey (1914–1988)
 Will Hay (1888–1949)
 Richard Haydn (1905–1985) 
 Erinn Hayes (born 1976)
 Sean Hayes (born 1970)
 Mike Hayley
 Natalie Haynes (born 1974)
 Ted Healy (1896–1937)
 Richard Hearne (1890–1987)
 Caleb Hearon (born 1995)
 Patricia Heaton (born 1958)
 Ian Hecox (born 1987)
 Mitch Hedberg (1968–2005)
 Jon Heder (born 1977)
 Briga Heelan (born 1987)
 Bobby Heenan (1943–2017)
 Kevin Heffernan (born 1968)
 John Heffron (born 1970)
 John Hegley (born 1953)
 Robert Hegyes (1951–2012)
 Tim Heidecker (born 1976)
 Jesse Heiman (born 1978)
 Hans-Joachim Heist (born 1949)
 Simon Helberg (born 1980)
 Grace Helbig (born 1985)
 Emily Heller (born 1985)
 Peter Helliar (born 1975)
 Nick Helm (born 1980)
 Katherine Helmond (1929–2019)
 Ed Helms (born 1974)
 Greg Hemphill (born 1969)
 Shirley Hemphill (1947–1999)
 Sherman Hemsley (1938–2012)
 Dickie Henderson (1922–1985)
 Christina Hendricks (born 1975)
 Elaine Hendrix (born 1970)
 Vic Henley (1962–2020)
 Marilu Henner (born 1952)
 Buck Henry (1930–2020)
 Lenny Henry (born 1958)
 Mike Henry (born 1964)
 John Henton (born 1960)
 Dai Henwood (born 1978)
 Hugh Herbert (1884–1952)
 Christoph Maria Herbst (born 1966)
 Tim Herlihy (born 1966)
 David Herman (born 1967)
 Thomas Hermanns (born 1963)
 Marcello Hernandez (born 1997)
 Richard Herring (born 1967)
 Seth Herzog (born 1970)
 Howard Hesseman (1940–2022)
 Bill Hicks (1961–1994)
 Ryan Higa (born 1990)
 David Anthony Higgins (born 1961)
 John Michael Higgins (born 1963)
 Maeve Higgins
 Steve Higgins (born 1963)
 Dieter Hildebrandt (1927–2013)
 Amy Hill (born 1953)
 Bec Hill
 Benny Hill (1924–1992)
 Dave Hill
 Dulé Hill (born 1975)
 Ed Hill (born 1984)
 Harry Hill (born 1964)
 Jonah Hill (born 1983)
 Martina Hill (born 1974)
 Melinda Hill
 Murray Hill
 Thelma Hill (1906-1938)
 Tymberlee Hill
 Jeff Hiller
 Adam Hills (born 1970)
 Tony Hinchcliffe (born 1984)
 Cheryl Hines (born 1965)
 Gregory Hines (1946–2003)
 Skip Hinnant (born 1940)
 Michael Hitchcock (born 1958)
 Justin Hires (born 1985)
 Judd Hirsch (born 1935)
 Matt Hobby (born 1985)
 Stephanie Hodge (born 1956)
 Jessy Hodges (born 1986)
 John Hodgman (born 1971)
 Joel Hodgson (born 1960)
 Jackie Hoffman (born 1960)
 Robby Hoffman
 Gaby Hoffmann (born 1982)
 Steve Hofstetter (born 1979)
 Chris Hogan (born 1970)
 Paul Hogan (born 1939)
 Siobhan Fallon Hogan (born 1961)
 Amy Hoggart (born 1986)
 Corey Holcomb (born 1969)
 Dominic Holland (born 1967)
 Mary Holland (born 1985)
 Vanessa Hollingshead
 Stanley Holloway (1890–1982)
 Anders Holm (born 1981)
 Chelsea Holmes (born 1993/1994)
 Dave Holmes (born 1971)
 Eamonn Holmes (born 1959)
 Jessica Holmes (born 1973)
 Pete Holmes (born 1979)
 Todd Holoubek (born 1969)
 Lauren Holt (born 1991)
 Helen Hong (born 1985)
 Brian Hooks (born 1974)
 Jan Hooks (1957–2014)
 Bob Hope (1903–2003)
 Sharon Horgan (born 1970)
 Kenneth Horne (1907–1969)
 Mathew Horne (born 1978)
 Alex Kapp Horner (born 1969)
 David Hornsby (born 1975)
 Don Hornsby (1924–1950)
 Lutz van der Horst (born 1975)
 Edward Everett Horton (1886–1970)
 Richard Steven Horvitz (born 1966)
 Curly Howard (1903–1952)
 Frankie Howerd (1917–1992)
 Ken Howard (1944–2016)
 Kyle Howard (born 1978)
 Moe Howard (1897–1975)
 Ron Howard (born 1954)
 Russell Howard (born 1980)
 Shemp Howard (1895–1955)
 Kirby Howell-Baptiste (born 1987)
 Glenn Howerton (born 1976)
 Lil Rel Howery (born 1979)
 Jeremy Hotz (born 1966)
 Roy Hudd (1936–2020)
 Oliver Hudson (born 1976)
 Rob Huebel (born 1969)
 Akilah Hughes (born 1989)
 Dave Hughes (born 1970)
 John Hughes (1950–2009)
 London Hughes (born 1989)
 Sean Hughes (1965–2017)
 Steve Hughes (born 1966)
 D. L. Hughley (born 1963)
 Daniel Humbarger
 Barry Humphries (born 1934)
 Bonnie Hunt (born 1961)
 Brendan Hunt (born 1972)
 Bill Hunter (1940–2011)
 Reginald D. Hunter (born 1969)
 David Huntsberger (born 1979)
 Carl Hurley (born 1941)
 Elizabeth Hurley (born 1965)
 Lillian Hurst (born 1943)
 Jake Hurwitz (born 1985)
 Jon Hurwitz (born 1977)
 Brian Huskey (born 1968)
 Toby Huss (born 1966)
 Warren Hutcherson

I

 Paul Iacono (born 1988)
 Sal Iacono (born 1971)
 Armando Iannucci (born 1963)
 Eric Idle (born 1943)
 Eddie Ifft (born 1974)
 Gabriel Iglesias (born 1976)
 Sabrina Impacciatore (born 1968)
 Robin Ince (born 1969)
 Neil Innes (1944–2019)
 Scott Innes (born 1966)
 Tino Insana (1948–2017)
 Dom Irrera (born 1948)
 Bill Irwin (born 1950)
 Harith Iskander (born 1966)
 Eddie Izzard (born 1962)

J

 Brandon T. Jackson (born 1984)
 Marc Evan Jackson (born 1970)
 Shantira Jackson
 Victoria Jackson (born 1959)
 Manny Jacinto (born 1987)
 Gillian Jacobs (born 1982)
 Abbi Jacobson (born 1984)
 Javed Jaffrey (born 1963)
 T.J. Jagodowski (born 1971)
 Gerburg Jahnke (born 1955)
 Sabrina Jalees (born 1985)
 Billy T. James (1948–1991)
 Elis James (born 1980)
 Janelle James
 Kevin James (born 1965)
 Jameela Jamil (born 1986)
 Gary Janetti (born 1966)
 Alia Janine (born 1978)
 Michael Patrick Jann (born 1970)
 Zoe Jarman (born 1982)
 Jay Jason (1915–2001)
 Sam Jay (born 1982)
 Kavin Jayaram (born 1980)
 Jim Jefferies (born 1977)
 Richard Jeni (1957–2007)
 Ken Jeong (born 1969)
 Anthony Jeselnik (born 1978)
 Geri Jewell (born 1956)
 Penn Jillette (born 1955)
 Maz Jobrani (born 1972)
 Jake Johannsen (born 1960)
 Anjelah Johnson (born 1982)
 Anthony Johnson (1966–2021)
 Chic Johnson (1891–1962)
 Jake Johnson (born 1978)
 James Austin Johnson (born 1989)
 Josh Johnson (born 1990)
 Nicole Randall Johnson (born 1973)
 Punkie Johnson (born 1985)
 Rebekka Johnson
 Slink Johnson
 Zainab Johnson
 Kristen Johnston (born 1967)
 Brandon Scott Jones (born 1984)
 "Hamburger" Jones
 Jason Jones (born 1967)
 Leslie Jones (born 1967)
 Luka Jones (born 1975)
 Matt Jones (born 1981)
 Orlando Jones (born 1968)
 Rashida Jones (born 1976)
 Terry Jones (1942–2020)
 Leslie Jordan (1955–2022)
 Lesley Joseph (born 1945)
 Colin Jost (born 1982)
 Mitra Jouhari (born 1992)
 Jesse Joyce (born 1978)
 Mario Joyner (born 1961)
 Mike Judge (born 1962)
 Andy Juett (born 1977)
 Phill Jupitus (born 1962)

K

 Daniel Kaluuya (born 1989)
 Madeline Kahn (1942–1999)
 Bess Kalb (born 1987)
 Jamie Kaler (born 1964)
 Mindy Kaling (born 1979)
 Adhir Kalyan (born 1983)
 Carol Kane (born 1952)
 Russell Kane (born 1975)
 Gabe Kaplan (born 1945)
 Myq Kaplan (born 1978)
 JP Karliak (born 1981)
 Uğur Rıfat Karlova (born 1980)
 Ian Karmel (born 1984)
 Richard Karn (born 1956)
 Jensen Karp (born 1979)
 Moshe Kasher (born 1979)
 Jackie Kashian (born 1963)
 John Kassir (born 1957)
 Chris Kattan (born 1970)
 Jonathan Katz (born 1946)
 Mickey Katz (1909–1985)
 Andy Kaufman (1949–1984)
 Julie Kavner (born 1950)
 Peter Kay (born 1973)
 Phil Kay (born 1969)
 Spencer Kayden (born 1971)
 Danny Kaye (1911–1987)
 Paul Kaye (born 1964)
 Stubby Kaye (1918–1997)
 Samson Kayo (born 1991/1992)
 Zoe Kazan (born 1983)
 Molly Kearney (born 1992)
 Diane Keaton (born 1946)
 Michael Keaton (born 1951)
 Carolin Kebekus (born 1980)
 John Keister (born 1956)
 Peter Kelamis (born 1967)
 Echo Kellum (born 1982)
 Chris Kelly (born 1983)
 Frank Kelly (1938–2016)
 Martha Kelly (born 1968)
 Patsy Kelly (1910–1981)
 Robert Kelly (born 1970)
 Pert Kelton (1907–1968)
 Ellie Kemper (born 1980)
 Suzanna Kempner (born 1985)
 Harriet Kemsley (born 1987)
 Sarah Kendall (born 1976)
 Edgar Kennedy (1890–1948)
 Graham Kennedy (1934–2005)
 Jamie Kennedy (born 1970)
 Mimi Kennedy (born 1948)
 Tom Kennedy (1885–1965)
 Trey Kennedy
 Kerri Kenney-Silver (born 1970)
 Jon Kenny (born 1957)
 Tom Kenny (born 1962)
 Sean Kent
 Humphrey Ker (born 1982)
 Langston Kerman (born 1987)
 Hape Kerkeling (born 1964)
 Michael Kessler (born 1967)
 Keegan-Michael Key (born 1971)
 Kristin Key (born 1980)
 Sarah Keyworth (born 1993)
 Amanullah Khan (born 1970)
 Guz Khan (born 1986)
 Shappi Khorsandi (born 1973)
 The Kid Mero (born 1983)
 Ford Kiernan (born 1962)
 Laura Kightlinger (born 1969)
 Pat Kilbane (born 1969)
 Craig Kilborn (born 1962)
 Taran Killam (born 1982)
 Laurie Kilmartin (born 1965)
 Jimmy Kimmel (born 1967)
 Kyle Kinane (born 1976)
 Richard Kind (born 1956)
 Andy Kindler (born 1956)
 Alan King (1927–2004)
 Anthony King
 Georgia King (born 1986)
 Jaime King (born 1979)
 Matt King (born 1968)
 Michael Patrick King (born 1954)
 Nika King
 Sam Kinison (1953–1992)
 Greg Kinnear (born 1963)
 Kathy Kinney (born 1954)
 Angela Kinsey (born 1971)
 Bruno Kirby (1949–2006)
 Bill Kirchenbauer  (born 1953)
 Jen Kirkman (born 1974)
 Matt Kirshen (born 1980)
 Takeshi Kitano (born 1947)
 Jonathan Kite (born 1979)
 Daniel Kitson (born 1977)
 Julie Klausner (born 1978)
 Chris Klein (born 1979)
 Jessi Klein (born 1975)
 Robert Klein (born 1942)
 Jordan Klepper (born 1979)
 Kevin Kline (born 1947)
 Jack Klugman (1922–2012)
 Jak Knight (1993–2022)
 Ted Knight (1923–1986)
 Wayne Knight (born 1955)
 Don Knotts (1924–2006)
 Christy Knowings (born 1980)
 Johnny Knoxville (born 1971)
 Chris Knutson
 Christine Ko (born 1988)
 Cody Ko (born 1990)
 Olga Koch
 David Koechner (born 1962)
 Stephanie Koenig (born 1987)
 Matt Koff
 Gaby Köster (born 1961)
 Michael Koman (born 1977)
 Hari Kondabolu (born 1982)
 Dada Kondke (1932–1998)
 Anna Konkle (born 1987)
 Jenni Konner (born 1971)
 Lynne Koplitz (born 1969)
 Harvey Korman (1927–2008)
 Annie Korzen (born 1938)
 Liza Koshy (born 1996)
 Michael Kosta (born 1979)
 Ernie Kovacs (1919–1962)
 Jo Koy (born 1971)
 Lindsey Kraft (born 1980)
 Jane Krakowski (born 1968)
 Eric Allan Kramer (born 1962)
 John Krasinski (born 1979)
 Diether Krebs (1947–2000)
 Bert Kreischer (born 1972)
 Howard Kremer (born 1971)
 Nathan Kress (born 1992)
 Jonathan Krisel (born 1979)
 Kurt Krömer (born 1974)
 Nick Kroll (born 1978)
 Mike Krüger (born 1951)
 David Krumholtz (born 1978)
 Esther Ku (born 1980)
 Lisa Kudrow (born 1963)
 Akshay Kumar (born 1967)
 Nish Kumar (born 1985)
 Elvira Kurt (born 1961)
 Swoosie Kurtz (born 1944)
 Ashton Kutcher (born 1978)
 Eugenia Kuzmina (born 1987)
 Jeremy Kyle (born 1965)

L

 Tyler Labine (born 1978)
 Jake Lacy (born 1985)
 Preston Lacy (born 1969)
 Cathy Ladman
 Tomi Lahren (born 1992)
 Jon Lajoie (born 1980)
 Don Lake (born 1956)
 Maurice LaMarche (born 1958)
 Leah Lamarr (born 1988)
 Phil LaMarr (born 1967)
 Lisa Lampanelli (born 1961)
 Amy Landecker (born 1969)
 David Lander (1947–2020)
 Steve Landesberg (1936–2010)
 Matteo Lane (born 1982)
 Nathan Lane (born 1956)
 Richard Lane (1899–1982)
 Harry Langdon (1894–1944)
 Artie Lange (born 1967)
 Chris Langham (born 1949)
 Ruth Langsford (born 1960)
 Beth Lapides
 Lauren Lapkus (born 1985)
 Rocky LaPorte
 John Larroquette (born 1947)
 Larry the Cable Guy (born 1963)
 Jay Larson
 Queen Latifah (born 1970)
 Stan Laurel (1890–1965)
 Dan Lauria (born 1947)
 Hugh Laurie (born 1959)
 Ed Lauter (1938–2013)
 Tony Law (born 1969)
 Bill Lawrence (born 1968)
 Carolyn Lawrence (born 1967)
 Doug Lawrence (born 1969)
 Martin Lawrence (born 1965)
 Mike Lawrence (born 1983)
 Vicki Lawrence (born 1949)
 Cloris Leachman (1926–2021)
 Denis Leary (born 1957)
 Matt LeBlanc (born 1967)
 Annie Lederman (born 1983)
 Andy Lee (born 1981)
 Bobby Lee (born 1972)
 C.S. Lee (born 1971)
 Greg Lee (born 1962)
 Hana Mae Lee (born 1988)
 Jamie Lee (born 1983)
 Jason Lee (born 1970)
 Raquel Lee (born 1986)
 Rex Lee (born 1969)
 Stewart Lee (born 1968)
 Terence Lee (born 1964)
 Andrew Leeds (born 1981)
 Jane Leeves (born 1961)
 Michael Legge (born 1968)
 Natasha Leggero (born 1974)
 John Leguizamo (born 1964)
 John Lehr (born 1965)
 Tom Lehrer (born 1928)
 Carol Leifer (born 1956)
 Ismo Leikola (born 1979)
 Steve Lemme (born 1968)
 Jack Lemmon (1925–2001)
 Nancy Lenehan (born 1953)
 Tom Lenk (born 1976)
 Thomas Lennon (born 1970)
 Jay Leno (born 1950)
 Jack E. Leonard (1910–1973)
 Chauncey Leopardi (born 1981)
 Yassir Lester (born 1984)
 James Lesure (born 1970)
 David Letterman (born 1947)
 Sam Levenson (1911–1980)
 Johnny Lever (born 1950)
 Zachary Levi (born 1980)
 Samm Levine (born 1982)
 Cash Levy
 Dan Levy (born 1981)
 Dan Levy (born 1983)
 Eugene Levy (born 1946)
 Clea Lewis (born 1965)
 Jenifer Lewis (born 1957)
 Jerry Lewis (1926–2017)
 Kimrie Lewis (born 1982)
 Phill Lewis (born 1968)
 Richard Lewis (born 1947)
 Shari Lewis (1933-1998)
 Vicki Lewis (born 1960)
 Kobi Libii
 Paul Lieberstein (born 1967)
 Wendy Liebman (born 1961)
 Gabe Liedman (born 1982)
 Judith Light (born 1949)
 Lil Dicky (born 1988)
 Lil' JJ (born 1990)
 Matthew Lillard (born 1970)
 Hal Linden (born 1931)
 Riki Lindhome (born 1979)
 Joe Lipari (born 1979)
 Joe List (born 1982)
 Zoe Lister-Jones (born 1982)
 Ian Lithgow (born 1972)
 John Lithgow (born 1945)
 Rich Little (born 1938)
 Rob Little (born 1972)
 Steve Little (born 1972)
 Beth Littleford (born 1968)
 Lucy Liu (born 1968)
 Christopher Lloyd (born 1938)
 Harold Lloyd (1893–1971)
 Roger Lloyd-Pack (1944-2014)
 Joe Lo Truglio (born 1970)
 Daniel Lobell (born 1982/1983)
 Sean Lock (1963–2021)
 Greg London (born 1966)
 Jay London (born 1966)
 Josie Long (born 1982)
 Justin Long (born 1978)
 Shelley Long (born 1949)
 Michael Longfellow (born 1994)
 Andrés López (born 1971)
 George Lopez (born 1961)
 Dave Losso
 Julia Louis-Dreyfus (born 1961)
 Faizon Love (born 1968)
 Jason Love
 Judi Love (born 1980)
 Loni Love (born 1971)
 Jon Lovett (born 1982)
 Jon Lovitz (born 1957)
 Rob Lowe (born 1964)
 Chris Lowell (born 1984)
 Britt Lower (born 1985)
 Adam Lowitt
 Mark Lowry (born 1958)
 Matt Lucas (born 1974)
 Luenell (born 1959)
 Joanna Lumley (born 1946)
 Eric Lutes (born 1962)
 John Lutz (born 1973)
 Joe Lycett (born 1988)
 Desi Lydic (born 1981)
 Carmen Lynch (born 1972)
 Drew Lynch (born 1991)
 Jane Lynch (born 1960)
 Katherine Lynch (born 1972)
 Ross Lynch (born 1995)
 Stephen Lynch (born 1971)
 Paul Lynde (1926–1982)
 Chelcie Lynn
 Melanie Lynskey (born 1977)
 Natasha Lyonne (born 1979)

M

 Moms Mabley (1894–1975)
 Bernie Mac (1957–2008)
 Hayes MacArthur (born 1977)
 Scott MacArthur (born 1979)
 Norm Macdonald (1959–2021)
 Rachael MacFarlane (born 1976)
 Seth MacFarlane (born 1973)
 Gavin MacLeod (1931-2021)
 Fred MacMurray (1908-1991)
 Justina Machado (born 1972)
 April Macie (born 1975)
 Laird Macintosh (born 1962)
 Charles Mack (1888–1934)
 Lee Mack (born 1968)
 Mary Mack (born 1975)
 Doon Mackichan (born 1962)
 Chris Maddock (born 1977/1978)
 Kathleen Madigan (born 1965)
 Al Madrigal (born 1971)
 Scooter Magruder (born 1988)
 Sean Maguire (born 1976)
 Naveed Mahbub
 Bill Maher (born 1956)
 Bruce Mahler (born 1950)
 Bobby Mair (born 1986)
 Shaun Majumder (born 1972)
 Wendie Malick (born 1950)
 Joshua Malina (born 1966)
 Keith Malley (born 1974)
 Joe Mande (born 1983)
 David Mandel (born 1970)
 Howie Mandel (born 1955)
 Dylan Mandlsohn (born 1980/1981)
 Aasif Mandvi (born 1966)
 Jason Manford (born 1981)
 Stephen Mangan (born 1968)
 Jonathan Mangum (born 1971)
 Sunita Mani (born 1986)
 Sebastian Maniscalco (born 1973)
 Leslie Mann (born 1972)
 Charlie Manna (1920–1970)
 Bernard Manning (1930–2007)
 Taryn Manning (born 1978)
 J.P. Manoux (born 1969)
 Jason Mantzoukas (born 1972)
 Alec Mapa (born 1965)
 Jenna Marbles (born 1986)
 Joseph Marcell (born 1948)
 Cheech Marin (born 1946)
 Ken Marino (born 1968)
 Pigmeat Markham (1904–1981)
 Bob Marley (born 1967)
 Marc Maron (born 1963)
 Ross Marquand (born 1981)
 Zoë Coombs Marr
 Elizabeth Marrero (born 1963)
 Dylan Marron (born 1988)
 Betty Marsden (1919–1998)
 James Marsden (born 1973)
 Garry Marshall (1934–2016)
 Penny Marshall (1943–2018)
 Andrea Martin (born 1947)
 Dean Martin (1917–1995)
 Demetri Martin (born 1973)
 Dick Martin (1922–2008)
 Duane Martin (born 1965)
 Eddy Martin (born 1990)
 Mae Martin (born 1987)
 Steve Martin (born 1945)
 Adrian Martinez (born 1972)
 Jackie Martling (born 1947)
 Karen Maruyama (born 1958)
 Chico Marx (1887–1961)
 Groucho Marx (1890–1977)
 Gummo Marx (1892–1977)
 Harpo Marx (1888–1964)
 Patricia Marx
 Zeppo Marx (1901–1979)
 Jackie Mason (1928–2021)
 Christopher Massey (born 1990)
 Kyle Massey (born 1991)
 Christopher Masterson (born 1980)
 Danny Masterson (born 1976)
 Sean Masterson
 Rose Matafeo (born 1992)
 Ross Mathews (born 1979)
 Shane Mauss (born 1980)
 Andrew Maxwell (born 1974)
 Elaine May (born 1932)
 Ralphie May (1972–2017)
 Jayma Mays (born 1979)
 Rik Mayall (1958–2014)
 Wendy Maybury (born 1974/1975)
 Alphonso McAuley (born 1984)
 Jack McBrayer (born 1973)
 Danny McBride (born 1976)
 Jenny McCarthy (born 1972)
 Matt McCarthy (born 1979)
 Melissa McCarthy (born 1970)
 Dave McCary (born 1985)
 Rue McClanahan (1934–2010)
 Fancy Ray McCloney
 Matthew McConaughey (born 1969)
 Brian McConnachie (born 1942)
 Eric McCormack (born 1963)
 Dan McCoy (born 1978)
 Michael McCullers (born 1971)
 Bruce McCulloch (born 1961)
 Julian McCullough (born 1979)
 Paul McCullough (1883–1936)
 Paul McDermott (born 1962)
 Josh McDermitt (born 1978)
 Heather McDonald (born 1970)
 Kevin McDonald (born 1961)
 Michael McDonald (born 1964)
 Charlie McDonnell (born 1990)
 Charlie McDowell (born 1983)
 Rob McElhenney (born 1977)
 Griffin McElroy (born 1987)
 Justin McElroy (born 1980)
 Travis McElroy (born 1983)
 Bonnie McFarlane (born 1973)
 Caitlin McGee (born 1988)
 John C. McGinley (born 1959)
 Ted McGinley (born 1958)
 Joel McHale (born 1971)
 Jan McInnis
 Michael McIntyre (born 1976)
 Adam McKay (born 1968)
 Antoine McKay (born 1970)
 Michael McKean (born 1947)
 Jessica McKenna (born 1987)
 Bret McKenzie (born 1976)
 Brian McKim
 Mark McKinney (born 1959)
 Kate McKinnon (born 1984)
 Wendi McLendon-Covey (born 1969)
 Pauline McLynn (born 1962)
 Ed McMahon (1923–2009)
 Rove McManus (born 1974)
 Don McMillan
 Ryan McPartlin (born 1975)
 Vaughn Meader (1936–2004)
 Tim Meadows (born 1961)
 Kevin Meaney (1956–2016)
 Anne Meara (1929–2015)
 Matt Meese (born 1983)
 Keyla Monterroso Mejia (born 1998)
 Fred Melamed (born 1956)
 Stuttering John Melendez (born 1965)
 Jill-Michele Melean (born 1979)
 Doug Mellard
 Carlos Mencia (born 1967)
 Rick Mercer (born 1969)
 Stephen Merchant (born 1974)
 Dave Merheje
 Liz Meriwether (born 1981)
 Paul Merton (born 1957)
 Chris Messina (born 1974)
 Debra Messing (born 1968)
 Laurie Metcalf (born 1955)
 Art Metrano (1936–2021)
 Kurt Metzger (born 1977)
 Jason Mewes (born 1974)
 Breckin Meyer (born 1974)
 Josh Meyers (born 1976)
 Seth Meyers (born 1973)
 Florinda Meza (born 1948)
 Shaun Micallef (born 1962)
 Felicia Michaels (born 1964)
 Lorne Michaels (born 1944)
 Kate Micucci (born 1980)
 Thomas Middleditch (born 1982)
 Bette Midler (born 1945)
 A.D. Miles (born 1971)
 John Milhiser (born 1981)
 Ben Miller (born 1966)
 Christa Miller (born 1964)
 Dennis Miller (born 1953)
 Karlous Miller (born 1983)
 Larry Miller (born 1953)
 Marilyn Suzanne Miller (born 1950)
 Max Miller (1894–1963)
 Murray Miller (born 1976)
 T.J. Miller (born 1981)
 Sarah Millican (born 1975)
 Spike Milligan (1918–2002)
 Andy Milonakis (born 1976)
 Tim Minchin (born 1975)
 Brian Miner (born 1981)
 Hasan Minhaj (born 1985)
 Jerry Minor (born 1969)
 Dan Mintz (born 1981)
 Christopher Mintz-Plasse (born 1989)
 Matt Mira (born 1983)
 Lin-Manuel Miranda (born 1980)
 Eugene Mirman (born 1975)
 David Mitchell (born 1974)
 Finesse Mitchell (born 1972)
 Kel Mitchell (born 1978)
 Mike Mitchell (born 1982)
 Aditi Mittal
 Michael Mittermeier (born 1966)
 Katy Mixon (born 1981)
 Colin Mochrie (born 1957)
 Mehran Modiri (born 1967)
 Alex Moffat (born 1982)
 Kausar Mohammed (born 1992)
 Nick Mohammed (born 1980)
 Jay Mohr (born 1970)
 Al Molinaro (1919–2015)
 Richard Moll (born 1943)
 John Moloney
 Dominic Monaghan (born 1976)
 Mo'Nique (born 1967)
 Bob Monkhouse (1928–2003)
 Lucy Montgomery (born 1975)
 Kyle Mooney (born 1984)
 Nate Mooney
 Paul Mooney (1941–2021)
 Christina Moore (born 1973)
 Dudley Moore (1935–2002)
 Mary Tyler Moore (1936–2017)
 Michael Moore (born 1954)
 Rudy Ray Moore (1927–2008)
 Tim Moore (1887–1958)
 Trevor Moore (1980–2021)
 Victor Moore (1876–1962)
 Maribeth Monroe (born 1978)
 Natalie Morales (born 1985)
 Dylan Moran (born 1971)
 George Moran (1881–1949)
 Polly Moran (1883–1952)
 Rick Moranis (born 1953)
 Dave Mordal (born c. 1950–1960s)
 Eric Morecambe (1926–1984)
 Harley Morenstein (born 1985)
 Dermot Morgan (1952–1998)
 Elliott Morgan (born 1987)
 John Morgan (1930–2004)
 Matt Morgan (born 1977)
 Piers Morgan (born 1965)
 Tracy Morgan (born 1968)
 Brent Morin (born 1986)
 Pat Morita (1932–2005)
 Sam Morril (born 1986)
 Brad Morris (born 1975)
 Chris Morris (born 1965)
 Garrett Morris (born 1937)
 Lamorne Morris (born 1983)
 Seth Morris (born 1970)
 Eleanor Morton
 Lew Morton
 Laci Mosley (born 1991)
 Don Most (born 1953)
 Zero Mostel (1915–1977)
 José Sánchez Mota (born 1965)
 Bobby Moynihan (born 1977)
 Teacher Mpamire (born 1983)
 John Mulaney (born 1982)
 Martin Mull (born 1943)
 Megan Mullally (born 1958)
 Mitch Mullany (1968–2008)
 Neil Mullarkey (born 1961)
 Annie Mumolo (born 1973)
 Noah Munck (born 1996)
 Olivia Munn (born 1980)
 Simon Munnery (born 1967)
 Richard Murdoch (1907–1990)
 Annie Murphy (born 1986)
 Charlie Murphy (1959–2017)
 Colin Murphy (born 1968)
 Eddie Murphy (born 1961)
 Kevin Murphy (born 1956)
 Larry Murphy (born 1972)
 Morgan Murphy (born 1981)
 Noel Murphy (born 1961)
 Al Murray (born 1968)
 Bill Murray (born 1950)
 James Murray (born 1976)
 Jan Murray (1916–2006)
 Joel Murray (born 1963)
 Lorenzo Music (1937–2001)
 Erik Myers
 Mike Myers (born 1963)
 Arden Myrin (born 1973)

N

 Jim Nabors (1930–2017)
 Suzy Nakamura (born 1968)
 Leonardo Nam (born 1979)
 Philomaine Nanema (born 1982) 
 Aparna Nancherla (born 1982)
 Kumail Nanjiani (born 1978)
 Paul Nardizzi
 Jason Narvy (born 1974)
 Amber Nash (born 1977)
 Jason Nash (born 1973)
 Niecy Nash (born 1970)
 Rex Navarette (born 1969)
 Henry Naylor (born 1966)
 Kunal Nayyar (born 1981)
 Cliff Nazarro (1904–1961)
 Kevin Nealon (born 1953)
 Lucas Neff (born 1985)
 Taylor Negron (1957–2015)
 Jamar Neighbors (born 1986)
 Bob Nelson (born 1958)
 Bridget Jones Nelson (born 1964)
 Craig T. Nelson (born 1944)
 Michael J. Nelson (born 1964)
 Ozzie Nelson (1906-1975)
 Nick Nemeroff (1989–2022)
 Felipe Neto
 Kyle Newacheck (born 1984)
 Bob Newhart (born 1929)
 Griffin Newman (born 1989)
 Laraine Newman (born 1952)
 Robert Newman (born 1964)
 Tawny Newsome (born 1983)
 Bert Newton (1938–2021)
 Lee Newton (born 1985)
 Desus Nice (born 1981)
 Phil Nichol
 Mike Nichols (1931–2014)
 Leslie Nielsen (1926–2010)
 Trevor Noah (born 1984)
 Ross Noble (born 1976)
 Coleen Nolan (born 1965)
 Henry Normal (born 1956)
 Hayley Marie Norman (born 1989)
 Mark Normand (born 1983)
 Austin North (born 1996)
 Nolan North (born 1970)
 Graham Norton (born 1963)
 Jim Norton (born 1968)
 Duncan Norvelle (born 1958)
 Tig Notaro (born 1971)
 B. J. Novak (born 1979)
 Jacqueline Novak (born 1982)
 Kayvan Novak (born 1978)
 Don Novello (born 1943)
 Dieter Nuhr (born 1960)
 Luke Null (born 1990)
 Whindersson Nunes (born 1995)
 Oscar Nunez (born 1958)
 Ego Nwodim (born 1988)
 Bill Nye (born 1955)
 Louis Nye (1913–2005)

O

 Jay Oakerson (born 1977)
 Matt Oberg (born 1976)
 Dara Ó Briain (born 1972)
 Conan O'Brien (born 1963)
 Mike O'Brien (born 1976)
 Jerry O'Connell (born 1974)
 Ryan O'Connell (born 1986)
 Carroll O'Connor (1924–2001)
 Des O'Connor (1932-2020)
 Donald O'Connor (1925–2003)
 Sean O'Connor (born 1985)
 Bill Oddie (born 1941)
 Bob Odenkirk (born 1962)
 Claudia O'Doherty (born 1983)
 David O'Doherty (born 1975)
 Mark O'Donnell (1954–2012)
 Rosie O'Donnell (born 1962)
 Steve O'Donnell (born 1954)
 Michael O'Donoghue (1940–1994)
 Chris O'Dowd (born 1979)
 Nick Offerman (born 1970)
 Paul O'Grady (born 1955)
 Ardal O'Hanlon (born 1965)
 Catherine O'Hara (born 1954)
 Jim O'Heir (born 1962)
 John O'Hurley (born 1954)
 Atsuko Okatsuka (born 1988)
 Tricia O'Kelley (born 1968)
 Earl Okin (born 1947)
 Amy Okuda (born 1989)
 John Oliver (born 1977)
 Alberto Olmedo (1933–1988)
 Ole Olsen (1892–1963)
 Kaitlin Olson (born 1975)
 Timothy Olyphant (born 1968)
 Conner O'Malley (born 1986)
 Mike O'Malley (born 1966)
 Timothy Omundson (born 1969)
 Patrice O'Neal (1969–2011)
 Ed O'Neill (born 1946)
 Steve Oram (born 1973)
 Yvonne Orji (born 1983)
 Zak Orth (born 1970)
 Andrew Orvedahl (born 1976)
 Barunka O'Shaughnessy
 Andi Osho (born 1973)
 Aida Osman (born 1997)
 David Ossman (born 1936)
 Dan Oster (born 1981)
 Patton Oswalt (born 1969)
 Cheri Oteri (born 1962)
 Rick Overton (born 1954)
 Bill Owen (1914–1999)
 Gary Owen (born 1974)
 Larry Owens
 Gil Ozeri

P

 Jack Paar (1918–2004)
 Frankie Pace
 Celia Pacquola (born 1983)
 Anthony Padilla (born 1987)
 Monica Padman (born 1987)
 Elliot Page (born 1987)
 LaWanda Page (1920–2002)
 Natalie Palamides (born 1990)
 Ron Palillo (1949–2012)
 Michael Palin (born 1943)
 Adam Pally (born 1982)
 Candy Palmater (1968–2021)
 Keke Palmer (born 1993)
 Maulik Pancholy (born 1974)
 Franklin Pangborn (1889–1958)
 John Pankow (born 1954)
 Tom Papa (born 1968)
 Yannis Pappas (born 1975)
 John Paragon (1954–2021)
 Zhubin Parang (born 1981)
 Jimmy Pardo (born 1966)
 Ron Pardo (born 1967)
 Lennon Parham (born 1976)
 Sandeep Parikh (born 1980)
 Randall Park (born 1974)
 Sydney Park (born 1997)
 Nicole Parker (born 1978)
 Pardis Parker
 Paula Jai Parker (born 1969)
 Sarah Jessica Parker (born 1965)
 Trey Parker (born 1969)
 Chris Parnell (born 1967)
 Grace Parra (born 1984)
 Rachel Parris (born 1984)
 Andy Parsons (born 1967)
 Jim Parsons (born 1973)
 Karyn Parsons (born 1965)
 Sara Pascoe (born 1981)
 Joe Pasquale (born 1961)
 Bastian Pastewka (born 1972)
 Kasha Patel (born 1991)
 Nimesh Patel (born 1986)
 Punam Patel (born 1993)
 Ravi Patel (born 1978)
 Edi Patterson (born 1972)
 Pat Paulsen (1927–1997)
 Rob Paulsen (born 1956)
 David Paymer (born 1954)
 Allen Payne (born 1968)
 Christina Pazsitzky (born 1976)
 Ray Peacock (born 1973)
 Trevor Peacock (1931-2021)
 Jack Pearl (1894-1982)
 Minnie Pearl (1912–1996)
 Zack Pearlman (born 1988)
 Josh Peck (born 1986)
 Artemis Pebdani (born 1977)
 Ron Pederson (born 1978)
 Nasim Pedrad (born 1981)
 Jordan Peele (born 1979)
 Simon Pegg (born 1970)
 Paula Pell (born 1963)
 Jessimae Peluso (born 1982)
 Johnny Pemberton (born 1981)
 Steve Pemberton (born 1967)
 Kal Penn (born 1977)
 Joe Penner (1904–1941)
 Eddie Pepitone (born 1958)
 Joe Pera (born 1988/1989)
 Kevin Pereira (born 1982)
 Chelsea Peretti (born 1978)
 Danielle Perez 
 Dewayne Perkins (born 1990)
 Kathleen Rose Perkins (born 1974)
 Sue Perkins (born 1969)
 Rhea Perlman (born 1948)
 Matthew Perry (born 1969)
 Tyler Perry (born 1969)
 Jon Pertwee (1919–1996)
 Tammy Pescatelli (born 1969)
 Melissa Peterman (born 1971)
 Russell Peters (born 1970)
 Paul Petersen (born 1945)
 Cassandra Peterson (born 1951)
 Alexandra Petri (born 1988)
 Dat Phan (born 1975)
 Jay Pharoah (born 1987)
 J.J. Philbin (born 1974)
 Regis Philbin (1931-2020)
 Busy Philipps (born 1979)
 Emo Philips (born 1956)
 Henry Phillips (born 1969)
 Sally Phillips (born 1970)
 Philomaine Nanema, aka Philo (born 1982)
 Dannah Phirman (born 1975)
 Andrew Phung (born 1984)
 Chonda Pierce (born 1960)
 David Hyde Pierce (born 1959)
 Amy Pietz (born 1969)
 Karl Pilkington (born 1972)
 Daniella Pineda (born 1987)
 John Pinette (1964–2014)
 Ryan Pinkston (born 1988)
 Danielle Pinnock (born 1988)
 Joe Piscopo (born 1951)
 ZaSu Pitts (1894–1963)
 Jeremy Piven (born 1965)
 Nigel Planer (born 1953)
 Ben Platt (born 1993)
 Aubrey Plaza (born 1984)
 Amy Poehler (born 1971)
 Greg Poehler (born 1974)
 Kevin Pollak (born 1957)
 Mike Pollock (born 1965)
 Jorge Porcel (1936–2006)
 Javier Portales (1937–2003)
 Chris Porter (born 1979)
 Don Porter (1912-1997)
 Brian Posehn (born 1966)
 Tom Poston (1921–2007)
 Annie Potts (born 1952)
 Paula Poundstone (born 1959)
 Esther Povitsky (born 1988)
 Dante Powell (born 1987/1988)
 Glen Powell (born 1988)
 Navin Prabhakar
 Chris Pratt (born 1979)
 Guy Pratt (born 1962)
 Kyla Pratt (born 1986)
 Jaime Pressly (born 1977)
 Amber Preston
 Eric Price (born 1974)
 Tom Price (born 1980)
 Freddie Prinze (1954–1977)
 Freddie Prinze Jr. (born 1976)
 Kiri Pritchard Mclean (born 1986)
 Lauren Pritchard (born 1977)
 Michael Pritchard (born 1950)
 Philip Proctor (born 1940)
 Markus Maria Profitlich (born 1960)
 Greg Proops (born 1959)
 Mark Proksch (born 1978)
 Paul Provenza (born 1957)
 Kelly Pryce (born 1986/1987)
 DJ Pryor (born 1988)
 Richard Pryor (1940–2005)
 Danny Pudi (born 1979)
 Rolo Puente (1939–2011)
 Lucy Punch (born 1977)
 Steve Punt (born 1962)
 Missi Pyle (born 1972)

Q

 Adam Quesnell (born 1981/1982)
 Apollo Quiboloy (born 1950)
 Kate Quigley (born 1982)
 Brian Quinn (born 1976)
 Colin Quinn (born 1959)
 Frankie Quiñones (born 1983)
 Pauline Quirke (born 1959)

R

 Stefan Raab (born 1966)
 Gilda Radner (1946–1989)
 Josh Radnor (born 1974)
 Kat Radley (born 1985)
 Charlotte Rae (1926–2018)
 Issa Rae (born 1985)
 Rags Ragland (1905–1946)
 Jeff Ragsdale
 Randy Rainbow (born 1981)
 Mary Lynn Rajskub (born 1971)
 Louis Ramey
 Harold Ramis (1944–2014)
 Rachel Ramras (born 1974)
 Chris Ramsey (born 1986)
 Franchesca Ramsey (born 1983)
 Tony Randall (1920–2004)
 Joe Randazzo (born 1978)
 Frank Randle (1901–1957)
 Romesh Ranganathan (born 1978)
 Richard Rankin (born 1983)
 Stephen Rannazzisi (born 1977)
 Andrew Rannells (born 1978)
 Michael Rapaport (born 1970)
 June Diane Raphael (born 1980)
 Jim Rash (born 1971)
 Allison Raskin (born 1989)
 Meaghan Rath (born 1986)
 Connor Ratliff
 John Ratzenberger (born 1947)
 Melissa Rauch (born 1980)
 Raven-Symoné (born 1985)
 Donnell Rawlings (born 1968)
 Adam Ray (born 1982)
 Jonah Ray (born 1981)
 Rachael Ray (born 1968)
 Ted Ray (1905–1977)
 Martha Raye (1916–1994)
 Al Read (1909–1987)
 Howard Read (born 1984)
 Diona Reasonover (born 1992)
 Spoken Reasons (born 1988)
 Andreas Rebers (born 1958)
 Chris Redd (born 1985)
 Jasper Redd (born 1979)
 Donna Reed (1921-1986)
 Jon Reep (born 1972)
 Vic Reeves (born 1959)
 Brian Regan (born 1958)
 Jason Reich
 Sam Reich (born 1984)
 Noah Reid (born 1987)
 Tara Reid (born 1975)
 Tim Reid (born 1944)
 John C. Reilly (born 1965)
 Carl Reiner (1922–2020)
 Rob Reiner (born 1947)
 Paul Reiser (born 1956)
 Ivan Reitman (1946–2022)
 Leah Remini (born 1970)
 Roy Rene (1892–1954)
 Adam Resnick
 Retta (born 1970)
 Paul Reubens (born 1952)
 Simon Rex (born 1974)
 Alex Reymundo
 Burt Reynolds (1936–2018)
 John Reynolds (born 1991)
 Rick Reynolds (born 1951)
 Ryan Reynolds (born 1976)
 Caroline Rhea (born 1964)
 Erica Rhodes (born 1983)
 Tom Rhodes (born 1967)
 Alfonso Ribiero (born 1971)
 Giovanni Ribisi (born 1974)
 Alison Rich
 Katie Rich
 Simon Rich (born 1984)
 Jeff Richards (born 1974)
 Michael Richards (born 1949)
 April Richardson (born 1979)
 Jon Richardson (born 1982)
 Matt Richardson (born 1991)
 Miranda Richardson (born 1958)
 Sam Richardson (born 1984)
 Mathias Richling (born 1953)
 Andy Richter (born 1966)
 Laurence Rickard (born 1975)
 Don Rickles (1926–2017)
 Matt Rife (born 1995)
 Daniel Rigby (born 1982)
 Rob Riggle (born 1970)
 Gina Riley (born 1961)
 Jack Riley (1935–2016)
 Jason Ritter (born 1980)
 John Ritter (1948–2003)
 Tyler Ritter (born 1985)
 Al Ritz (1901–1965)
 Harry Ritz (1907–1986)
 Jimmy Ritz (1904–1985)
 Emilio Rivera (born 1961)
 Joan Rivers (1933–2014)
 Rowland Rivron (born 1958)
 Steve Rizzo
 Ted Robbins (born 1955)
 Lyda Roberti (1906–1938)
 Doris Roberts (1925–2016)
 Ian Roberts (born 1965)
 John Roberts (born 1971)
 Jeanne Robertson (1943–2021)
 Craig Robinson (born 1971)
 Joe Robinson (born 1968)
 Leonard Robinson
 Phoebe Robinson (born 1984)
 Tim Robinson (born 1981)
 Linda Robson (born 1958)
 Mo Rocca (born 1969)
 Chris Rock (born 1965)
 Tony Rock (born 1974)
 Charles Rocket (1949–2005)
 Glenn Rockowitz (born 1970)
 Aida Rodriguez (born 1977)
 Guillermo Rodriguez (born 1971)
 Paul Rodriguez (born 1955)
 Daniel Roebuck (born 1963)
 Joe Rogan (born 1967)
 Lauren Miller Rogen (born 1982)
 Seth Rogen (born 1982)
 Matt Rogers (born 1990)
 Will Rogers (1879–1935)
 Justin Roiland (born 1980)
 Henry Rollins (born 1961)
 Freddie Roman (1937–2022)
 Rick Roman (1966–1992)
 Larry Romano (born 1963)
 Ray Romano (born 1957)
 Michael Roof (1976–2009)
 Mickey Rooney (1920–2014)
 Stephen Root (born 1951)
 George Roper (1934–2003)
 Tony Rosato (1954–2017)
 Patty Rosborough
 Rose Marie (1923–2017)
 Andrea Rosen (born 1974)
 Michael Rosenbaum (born 1972)
 Jeffrey Ross (born 1965)
 Jonathan Ross (born 1960)
 Lonny Ross (born 1978)
 Tracee Ellis Ross (born 1972)
 Steve Rossi (1932–2014)
 Eli Roth (born 1972)
 Barry Rothbart (born 1983)
 Natasha Rothwell (born 1980)
 Mitch Rouse (born 1964)
 Patricia Routledge (born 1929)
 Dan Rowan (1922–1987)
 Patsy Rowlands (1931–2005)
 Ben Roy (born 1979)
 Alex Rubens
 Michael Rubens
 Alan Ruck (born 1956)
 Paul Rudd (born 1969)
 Rita Rudner (born 1953)
 Jon Rudnitsky (born 1989)
 Maya Rudolph (born 1972)
 Amber Ruffin (born 1979)
 Kevin Ruf (born 1961)
 Sara Rue (born 1979)
 Charlie Ruggles (1886–1970)
 Chris Rush (1946–2018)
 Willie Rushton (1937–1996)
 Anna Russell (1911–2006)
 Mark Russell (born 1932)
 Nipsey Russell (1918–2005)
 Rosalind Russell (1907-1976)
 Paul Rust (born 1981)
 Nick Rutherford (born 1985)
 Katherine Ryan (born 1983)
 Tommy Ryman (born 1983)

S

 Thomas Sadoski (born 1976)
 Jerry Sadowitz (born 1961)
 Bryan Safi
 Katey Sagal (born 1954)
 Bob Saget (1956–2022)
 Tami Sagher
 Mort Sahl (1927–2021)
 Nichole Sakura (born 1989)
 Rosa Salazar (born 1985)
 Charles "Chic" Sale (1885–1936)
 Soupy Sales (1926–2009)
 Peter Sallis (1921–2017)
 Tony Sam
 Andy Samberg (born 1978)
 Sugar Sammy (born 1976)
 Angus Sampson (born 1978/1979)
 Paul Sand (born 1932)
 Adam Sandler (born 1966)
 Isabel Sanford (1917-2004)
 Andrew Santino (born 1983)
 Carlos Santos (born 1986)
 Nico Santos (born 1979)
 Horatio Sanz (born 1969)
 Herb Sargent (1923–2005)
 Martin Sargent (born 1975)
 Will Sasso (born 1975)
 Drake Sather (1959–2004)
 Rajiv Satyal (born 1976)
 Jennifer Saunders (born 1958)
 Andrea Savage (born 1973)
 Ben Savage (born 1980)
 Fred Savage (born 1976)
 Alexei Sayle (born 1952)
 Brendan Scannell (born 1990)
 Kristen Schaal (born 1978)
 Sara Schaefer (born 1978)
 Akiva Schaffer (born 1977)
 Jackie Schaffer
 Jeff Schaffer (born 1970)
 Lewis Schaffer (born 1957)
 Tom Scharpling (born 1969)
 Mary Scheer (born 1963)
 Paul Scheer (born 1976)
 Ronnie Schell (born 1931)
 Gus Schilling (1908–1957)
 Robert Schimmel (1950–2010)
 Hayden Schlossberg (born 1978)
 Art Paul Schlosser (born 1960)
 Wilfried Schmickler (born 1954)
 Harald Schmidt (born 1957)
 Jana Schmieding
 Ralf Schmitz (born 1974)
 Danielle Schneider (born 1975)
 Helge Schneider (born 1955)
 Martin Schneider (born 1964)
 Rob Schneider (born 1963)
 Sarah Schneider (born 1983)
 Stephen Schneider (born 1980)
 Phillip Schofield (born 1962)
 Avery Schreiber (1935–2002)
 Paul Schrier (born 1970)
 Atze Schröder (born 1965)
 Olaf Schubert (born 1967)
 Richard Schull (1929–1999)
 Andrew Schulz (born 1983)
 Amy Schumer (born 1981)
 Michael Schur (born 1975)
 Leon Schuster (born 1951)
 Samba Schutte (born 1983)
 Ben Schwartz (born 1981)
 Jason Schwartzman (born 1980)
 Esther Schweins (born 1970)
 David Schwimmer (born 1966)
 Peter Scolari (1955–2021)
 Brian Scolaro (born 1973)
 Adam Scott (born 1973)
 Reid Scott (born 1977)
 Tom Everett Scott (born 1970)
 Seann William Scott (born 1976)
 Rory Scovel (born 1980)
 Amanda Seales (born 1981)
 Kenny Sebastian (born 1990)
 Harry Secombe (1921–2001)
 Amy Sedaris (born 1961)
 Rhea Seehorn (born 1972)
 George Segal (1934–2021)
 Jason Segel (born 1980)
 Tom Segura (born 1979)
 Streeter Seidell (born 1982)
 Jerry Seinfeld (born 1954)
 Peter Sellers (1925–1980)
 Larry Semon (1889–1928)
 Mack Sennett (1880–1960)
 Rachel Sennott (born 1995)
 Peter Serafinowicz (born 1972)
 Josh Server (born 1979)
 Joshua Seth (born 1970)
 Glenn Shadix (1952–2010)
 Ross Shafer (born 1954)
 Paul Shaffer (born 1949)
 Ari Shaffir (born 1974)
 Tony Shalhoub (born 1953)
 Garry Shandling (1949–2016)
 Paul Shane (1940-2013)
 Molly Shannon (born 1964)
 Kapil Sharma (born 1981)
 William Shatner (born 1931)
 Alia Shawkat (born 1989)
 Dick Shawn (1923–1987)
 Wallace Shawn (born 1943)
 Lin Shaye (born 1943)
 Brendan Schaub (born 1983)
 Harry Shearer (born 1943)
 Reece Shearsmith (born 1969)
 Charlie Sheen (born 1965)
 Derek Sheen (born 1970/1971)
 David Sheffield (born 1948)
 Angela V. Shelton (born 1970)
 Dax Shepard (born 1975)
 Sherri Shepherd (born 1967)
 Waen Shepherd (born 1971)
 Rondell Sheridan (born 1958)
 Allan Sherman (1924–1973)
 Sarah Sherman (born 1993)
 Brad Sherwood (born 1964)
 Tom Shillue (born 1966)
 Ken Shimura (1950–2020)
 Kevin Shinick (born 1969)
 Iliza Shlesinger (born 1983)
 Craig Shoemaker (born 1962)
 Pauly Shore (born 1968)
 Sammy Shore (1928–2019)
 Jake Short (born 1997)
 Martin Short (born 1950)
 Pat Shortt (born 1967)
 Michael Showalter (born 1970)
 Wil Shriner (born 1953)
 Jimmy Shubert
 Rosie Shuster (born 1950)
 Ritch Shydner (born 1952)
 Ali Siddiq (born 1973/1974)
 Denny Siegel 
 Darien Sills-Evans (born 1974)
 Laura Silverman (born 1966)
 Sarah Silverman (born 1970)
 Max Silvestri (born 1983)
 Phil Silvers (1911–1985)
 Arthur Simeon (born 1974)
 John Simmit (born 1963)
 Sam Simmons (born 1977)
 Hannah Simone (born 1980)
 Timothy Simons (born 1978)
 Jimmi Simpson (born 1975)
 Joan Sims (1930–2001)
 Sinbad (born 1956)
 Lilly Singh (born 1988)
 Hella von Sinnen (born 1959)
 Tiya Sircar (born 1982)
 Dave Sirus
 Red Skelton (1913–1997)
 Luke Ski (born 1974)
 Benito Skinner
 Frank Skinner (born 1957)
 Chuck Sklar
 Jenny Slate (born 1982)
 Tony Slattery (born 1959)
 Jonathan Slavin (born 1969)
 Bobby Slayton (born 1955)
 Dulcé Sloan (born 1983)
 Lindsay Sloane (born 1977)
 Daniel Sloss (born 1990)
 Brendon Small (born 1975)
 Lucien "Saluche" Small (1948–2007)
 Robert Smigel (born 1960)
 Rickey Smiley (born 1968)
 Yakov Smirnoff (born 1951)
 Arthur Smith (born 1954)
 Brandon Mychal Smith (born 1989)
 Brian Thomas Smith (born 1977)
 DeAnne Smith (born 1979)
 Joe Smith (1884–1981)
 Kevin Smith (born 1970)
 Kurtwood Smith (born 1943)
 Linda Smith (1958–2006)
 Margaret Smith
 Will Smith (born 1968)
 Will Smith (born 1971)
 Yeardley Smith (born 1964)
 JB Smoove (born 1965)
 Cobie Smulders (born 1982)
 Dana Snyder (born 1973)
 Liza Snyder (born 1968)
 Barry Sobel (born 1959)
 Betsy Sodaro (born 1984)
 Dan Soder (born 1983)
 John Solomon (born 1970)
 Laura Solon (born 1979)
 Lion Solser (born 1877)
 Kira Soltanovich (born 1973)
 Rich Sommer (born 1978)
 Sommore (born 1966)
 Karan Soni (born 1989)
 Ann Sothern (1909-2001)
 Karla Souza (born 1985)
 Kevin Spacey (born 1959)
 David Spade (born 1964)
 Hal Sparks (born 1969)
 Ron Sparks (born 1977)
 Aries Spears (born 1975)
 Rachel Specter (born 1980)
 Chris Spencer (born 1968)
 Dave Spikey (born 1950)
 Brent Spiner (born 1949)
 Justin Spitzer
 Thomas Spitzer (born 1988)
 Emily Spivey (born 1971)
 Brian Stack (born 1964)
 Jessica St. Clair (born 1976)
 Megan Stalter (born 1990)
 John Stamos (born 1963)
 Arnold Stang (1918–2009)
 Doug Stanhope (born 1967)
 Vivian Stanshall (1943–1995)
 Martin Starr (born 1982)
 Jen Statsky (born 1985)
 Mark Steel (born 1960)
 Steve Steen (born 1954)
 Mary Steenburgen (born 1953)
 Rob Stefaniuk (born 1971)
 David Steinberg (born 1942)
 Beth Stelling (born 1986)
 Jason Stephens 
 Pamela Stephenson (born 1949)
 Ford Sterling (1883–1939)
 Mindy Sterling (born 1953)
 Howard Stern (born 1954)
 Steve-O (born 1974)
 Michael Fenton Stevens (born 1958)
 Brody Stevens (1970–2019)
 Ray Stevens (born 1939)
 French Stewart (born 1964)
 Jon Stewart (born 1962)
 Paul Stewart (1908–1986)
 Ryan Stiles (born 1959)
 Ben Stiller (born 1965)
 Jerry Stiller (1927–2020)
 Jeff Stilson (born 1959)
 Nicholas Stoller (born 1976)
 Matt Stone (born 1971)
 Eric Stonestreet (born 1971)
 Larry Storch (1923–2022)
 Ryan Stout (born 1982)
 Michael Strahan (born 1971)
 Cordula Stratmann (born 1963)
 Daren Streblow (born 1971)
 Paul Strickland (born ?)
 Cecily Strong (born 1984)
 Rider Strong (born 1979)
 Jud Strunk (1936–1981)
 Moses Storm (born 1990)
 James Patrick Stuart (born 1968)
 Geoff Stults (born 1977)
 Jason Sudeikis (born 1975)
 Chris Sugden (born 1952)
 Alec Sulkin (born 1973)
 Nicole Sullivan (born 1970)
 Slim Summerville (1892–1946)
 Tika Sumpter (born 1980)
 Ethan Suplee (born 1976)
 Kevin Sussman (born 1970)
 Mena Suvari (born 1979)
 Nick Swardson (born 1976)
 John Swartzwelder (born 1949)
 Jim Sweeney (born 1955)
 Julia Sweeney (born 1959)
 Steve Sweeney (born 1949)
 Terry Sweeney (born 1950)
 Madylin Sweeten (born 1991)
 Jodie Sweetin (born 1982)
 C. C. Swiney (born 1981)
 Eric Sykes (1923–2012)
 Wanda Sykes (born 1964)
 Cynthia Szigeti (1949–2016)
 Magda Szubanski (born 1961)

T

 Jorma Taccone (born 1977)
 Rich Talarico (born 1973)
 Jill Talley (born 1962)
 Kerry Talmage (1963–2004)
 Kapil Talwalkar (born 1993)
 Danny Tamberelli (born 1982)
 Jeffrey Tambor (born 1944)
 Carl Tart (born 1989)
 Drew Tarver (born 1986)
 Emily Tarver (born 1982)
 Masashi Tashiro (born 1956)
 Catherine Tate (born 1969)
 Jacques Tati (1907–1982)
 Jimmy Tatro (born 1992)
 Jim Tavaré (born 1963)
 Christine Taylor (born 1971)
 Clarice Taylor (1917–2011)
 Ellie Taylor (born 1983)
 Johnny Taylor, Jr.
 Maddie Taylor (born 1966)
 Paul Taylor (born 1986)
 Rip Taylor (1931–2019)
 Tariq Teddy
 Teller (born 1948)
 Miles Teller (born 1987)
 Judy Tenuta (1949–2022)
 Maria Thayer (born 1975)
 Robin Thede (born 1979)
 Justin Theroux (born 1971)
 Alan Thicke (1947–2016)
 Terry-Thomas (1911–1990)
 Craig Thomas
 Danny Thomas (1914–1991)
 Dave Thomas (born 1949)
 Eddie Kaye Thomas (born 1980)
 Jay Thomas (1948–2017)
 Joe Thomas (born 1983)
 Josh Thomas (born 1987)
 Mark Thomas (born 1967)
 Michelle Thomas (1968–1998)
 Vinny Thomas (born 1997)
 Whitmer Thomas (born 1989)
 Tim Thomerson (born 1946)
 Greg Thomey (born 1961)
 Bobb'e J. Thompson (born 1996)
 Dave Thompson (born 1959)
 Emma Thompson (born 1959)
 Josh Robert Thompson (born 1975)
 Kenan Thompson (born 1978)
 Lea Thompson (born 1961)
 Scott Thompson (born 1959)
 Siobhan Thompson (born 1984)
 Nick Thune (born 1979)
 Baratunde Thurston (born 1977)
 Sarah Thyre (born 1968)
 Kai Tier
 Tommy Tiernan (born 1969)
 Christopher Titus (born 1964)
 Mukesh Tiwari (born 1969)
 Stephen Tobolowsky (born 1951)
 Thelma Todd (1905–1935)
 Sandi Toksvig (born 1958)
 Judy Toll (1958–2002)
 Allison Tolman (born 1981)
 Lily Tomlin (born 1939)
 David Tomlinson (1917-2000)
 Taylor Tomlinson (born 1993)
 Paul F. Tompkins (born 1968)
 TomSka (born 1990)
 Paul Tonkinson (born 1969)
 Barry Took (1928–2002)
 Shayne Topp (born 1991)
 Rip Torn (1931–2019)
 Nate Torrence (born 1977)
 Julio Torres (born 1987)
 Liz Torres (born 1947)
 Guy Torry (born 1969)
 Joe Torry (born 1965)
 Daniel Tosh (born 1975)
 Robert Townsend (born 1957)
 Jerry Trainor (born 1977)
 Rosie Tran (born 1984)
 Tien Tran (born 1987)
 Angela Trimbur (born 1981)
 Tommy Trinder (1909–1989)
 Duncan Trussell (born 1974)
 Irene Tu (born 1992)
 Bryan Tucker
 Chris Tucker (born 1971)
 Alan Tudyk (born 1971)
 Jane Turner (born 1960)
 Ben Turpin (1869–1940)
 Catherine Tyldesley (born 1983)
 Aisha Tyler (born 1970)

U

 Alanna Ubach (born 1975)
 Bob Uecker (born 1935)
 Tracey Ullman (born 1959)
 Sheryl Underwood (born 1963)
 Brian Unger (born 1965)
 Gabrielle Union (born 1972)
 Stanley Unwin (1911–2002)
 James Urbaniak (born 1963)
 Michael Urie (born 1980)

V

 John Valby, aka Dr. Dirty (born 1944)
 Ramón Valdés (1923–1988)
 Gary Valentine (born 1961)
 Billy Van (1934–2003)
 Dick Van Dyke (born 1925)
 Jerry Van Dyke (1931–2018)
 Danitra Vance (1954–1994)
 Nia Vardalos (born 1962)
 Janet Varney (born 1976)
 Jim Varney (1949–2000)
 Baron Vaughn (born 1980)
 Vince Vaughn (born 1970)
 Milana Vayntrub (born 1987)
 Radhika Vaz (born 1973)
 Jennifer Veal (born 1991)
 Johnny Vegas (born 1970)
 Prashanth Venkataramanujam (born 1987)
 Milo Ventimiglia (born 1977)
 Sofia Vergara (born 1972)
 Andrée Vermeulen (born 1982)
 Jackie Vernon (1924–1987)
 Wally Vernon (1904–1970)
 Eva Victor
 John Viener (born 1972)
 Gillian Vigman (born 1972)
 Kulap Vilaysack (born 1980)
 Carlos Villagrán (born 1942)
 Melissa Villaseñor (born 1987)
 Tim Vine (born 1967)
 Geraldine Viswanathan (born 1995)
 Jon Vitti (born 1960)
 Édgar Vivar (born 1944)
 Paul C. Vogt (born 1964)
 Theo Von (born 1980)
 Daniel von Bargen (1950–2015)
 Rich Vos (born 1957)
 Sal Vulcano (born 1976)

W

 Otto Waalkes (born 1948)
 Mark Wahlberg (born 1971)
 David Wain (born 1969)
 Lena Waithe (born 1984)
 Taika Waititi (born 1975)
 Eliot Wald (1946–2003)
 Gary Waldhorn (1943-2022)
 Christopher Walken (born 1943)
 Benjamin Walker (born 1982)
 Devon Walker (born 1991)
 Doug Walker (born 1981)
 Holly Walker (born 1967)
 Jimmie Walker (born 1947)
 Nancy Walker (1922-1992)
 Roy Walker (born 1940)
 Max Wall (1908–1990)
 Danny Wallace (born 1976)
 George Wallace (1895–1960)
 George Wallace Jnr (1918–1968)
 George Wallace (born 1952)
 Linda Wallem (born 1961)
 Phoebe Waller-Bridge (born 1985)
 David Walliams (born 1971)
 Ruth Wallis (1920–2007)
 Greg Walloch (born 1970)
 Bradley Walsh (born 1960)
 Brendon Walsh (born 1978)
 Holly Walsh (born 1980)
 Kate Walsh (born 1967)
 Mary Walsh (born 1952)
 Matt Walsh (born 1964)
 Ray Walston (1914-2001)
 Jessica Walter (1941–2021)
 Lisa Ann Walter (born 1963)
 Julie Walters (born 1950)
 David Walton (born 1978)
 Christoph Waltz (born 1956)
 Sheng Wang (born 1980)
 Keith Wann (born 1969)
 Patrick Warburton (born 1964)
 Mike Ward (born 1973)
 Brandon Wardell (born 1992)
 Eric Wareheim (born 1976)
 Marsha Warfield (born 1954)
 Malcolm-Jamal Warner (born 1970)
 Mike Warnke (born 1946)
 Rusty Warren (1930–2021)
 Derek Waters (born 1979)
 Michaela Watkins (born 1971)
 Reggie Watts (born 1972)
 Ruby Wax (born 1953)
 Damon Wayans (born 1960)
 Damon Wayans, Jr. (born 1982)
 Keenen Ivory Wayans (born 1958)
 Kim Wayans (born 1961)
 Marlon Wayans (born 1972)
 Shawn Wayans (born 1971)
 Robert Webb (born 1972)
 Steven Weber (born 1961)
 Lauren Weedman (born 1969)
 Ed Weeks (born 1980)
 Henning Wehn (born 1974)
 Brent Weinbach
 Stephnie Weir (born 1967)
 Danny Wells (1941-2013)
 Noël Wells (born 1986)
 George Wendt (born 1948)
 Ali Wentworth (born 1965)
 Amber Stevens West (born 1986)
 Billy West (born 1952)
 Lindy West (born 1982)
 Alice Wetterlund (born 1981)
 Wil Wheaton (born 1972)
 Brooks Wheelan (born 1986)
 Bert Wheeler (1895–1968)
 Betty White (1922–2021)
 Ellie White (born 1989)
 Jaleel White (born 1976)
 Mike White (born 1970)
 Ron White (born 1956)
 Slappy White (1921–1995)
 Jack Whitehall (born 1988)
 Jason John Whitehead
 Paul Whitehouse (born 1958)
 Bradley Whitford (born 1959)
 Kym Whitley (born 1961)
 Mae Whitman (born 1988)
 Josh Widdicombe (born 1983)
 Nick Wiger (born 1980)
 Tracey Wigfield (born 1983)
 Kristen Wiig (born 1973)
 Brian Wilde (1927–2008)
 Stefanie Wilder-Taylor
 Fred Willard (1933–2020)
 Ben Willbond (born 1973)
 Allison Williams (born 1988)
 Anson Williams (born 1949)
 Ashley Williams (born 1978)
 Barney Williams (1824–1876)
 Bert Williams (1874–1922)
 Brad Williams (born 1984)
 Charlie Williams (1927–2006)
 Chris Williams (born 1967)
 Cindy Williams (1947–2023)
 Gary Anthony Williams (born 1966)
 Harland Williams (born 1962)
 Jessica Williams (born 1986)
 Katt Williams (born 1973)
 Kenneth Williams (1926–1988)
 Mason Williams (born 1938)
 Robin Williams (1951–2014)
 Tyler James Williams (born 1992)
 Victor Williams (born 1970)
 Wendy Williams (born 1964)
 Dave Williamson
 Taylor Williamson
 Cardis Cardell Willis (1937–2007)
 Dave Willis (born 1970)
 Dave Willis (1895–1973)
 Denny Willis (1920–1995)
 Justin Willman (born 1980)
 Emma Willmann (born 1985)
 Holly Willoughby (born 1981)
 Larry Wilmore (born 1961)
 Casey Wilson (born 1980)
 Debra Wilson (born 1962)
 Demond Wilson (born 1946)
 Flip Wilson (1933–1998)
 Luke Wilson (born 1971)
 Owen Wilson (born 1968)
 Rainn Wilson (born 1966)
 Rebel Wilson (born 1980)
 Reno Wilson (born 1969)
 Thomas F. Wilson (born 1959)
 Bob Wiltfong (born 1969)
 Henry Winkler (born 1945)
 Lizz Winstead (born 1961)
 Jonathan Winters (1925–2013)
 Norman Wisdom (1915–2010)
 Chris Witaske (born 1983)
 Brenda Withers
 Harris Wittels (1984–2015)
 Fred Wolf (born 1964)
 Michelle Wolf (born 1985)
 Dennis Wolfberg (1946–1994)
 Jason Woliner (born 1980)
 Ali Wong (born 1982)
 Kristina Wong (born 1978)
 Roy Wood Jr. (born 1978)
 Victoria Wood (1953–2016)
 Danny Woodburn (born 1964)
 Kim Woodburn (born 1942)
 Zach Woods (born 1984)
 Glenn Wool (born 1974)
 Robert Woolsey (1888–1938)
 Harry Worth (1917–1989)
 Calum Worthy (born 1991)
 Mike Wozniak (born 1979)
 Edgar Wright (born 1974)
 Steven Wright (born 1955)
 Robert Wuhl (born 1951)
 Ed Wynn (1886–1966)

X
 Swami X (1925–2015)

Y

 Rajpal Yadav (born 1971)
 Marc Yaffee (born 1961)
 Kaya Yanar (born 1973)
 Alan Yang (born 1983)
 Bowen Yang (born 1990)
 Eugene Lee Yang (born 1986)
 Jenny Yang
 Jimmy O. Yang (born 1987)
 "Weird Al" Yankovic (born 1959)
 Cedric Yarbrough (born 1973)
 Mike Yard
 Mike Yarwood (born 1941)
 Gina Yashere (born 1974)
 Lucky Yates (born 1967)
 Dustin Ybarra (born 1989)
 Steven Yeun (born 1983)
 Charlyne Yi (born 1986)
 Cem Yılmaz (born 1973)
 Aaron Yonda (born 1973)
 Dwight York
 Heléne Yorke (born 1985)
 Alan Young (1919–2016)
 Parker Young (born 1988)
 Rick Younger (born 1969)
 Henny Youngman (1906–1998)
 Jaboukie Young-White (born 1994)
 Hampton Yount (born 1984)
 Bassem Youssef (born 1974)
 Ramy Youssef (born 1991)
 Joe Yule  (1892–1950)
 Imran Yusuf (born 1979)

Z

 Tincho Zabala (1923–2001)
 Hollywood Zakoshisyoh (born 1974)
 Andy Zaltzman (born 1974)
 Sasheer Zamata (born 1986)
 Katya Zamolodchikova
 Alex Zane (born 1979)
 Bob Zany (born 1961)
 Steve Zahn (born 1967)
 Steve Zaragoza (born 1982)
 Vitaly Zdorovetskiy (born 1992)
 Volodymyr Zelenskyy (born 1978)
 Henry Zebrowski (born 1984)
 David Zed
 Mather Zickel (born 1970)
 Dolph Ziggler (born 1980)
 Jenny Zigrino (born 1987)
 Jason Zimbler (born 1977)
 Steve Zissis (born 1975)
 Alan Zweibel (born 1950)

Comedy groups

 Ant & Dec
 Armstrong and Miller
 Abbott and Costello
 Barats and Bereta
 Beyond the Fringe
 Bob and Ray
 Bonzo Dog Doo-Dah Band
 Broken Lizard
 Brown and Carney
 Burns and Allen
 The Chaser
 Les Charlots
 Cheech and Chong
 Clark and McCullough
 The Comedy Store Players
 The Comic Strip
 Dalton Trumbo's Reluctant Cabaret
 The Firesign Theatre
 Flight of the Conchords
 Frangela
 The Frat Pack
 French and Saunders
 Garfunkel and Oates
 God's Pottery
 The Goons
 The Grumbleweeds
 Hale and Pace
 Hamish and Andy
 Hard 'n Phirm
 Homer and Jethro
 Key and Peele
 The Kids in the Hall
 The Kipper Kids
 Kreisiraadio from Estonia
 Lano and Woodley
 Laurel and Hardy
 The League of Gentlemen
 Little Britain
 The Little Rascals
 The Lonely Island
 Les Luthiers
 The Lucas Brothers
 Marijuana Logues
 Martin and Lewis
 Marx Brothers
 McKenzie Brothers
 The Mighty Boosh
 The Minnesota Wrecking Crew
 Mitchell and Webb
 Monty Python
 Morecambe and Wise
 Not Ready for Prime-Time Players (Saturday Night Live)
 Paul and Storm
 Penn & Teller
 Pete and Dud
 Phil Lord and Christopher Miller
 Please Don't Destroy
 Punt and Dennis
 Reeves and Mortimer
 The Ritz Brothers
 Rowan and Martin
 Royal Canadian Air Farce
 Scotland the What?
 Sklar Brothers
 Smith and Dale
 Smosh
 Smothers Brothers
 Stella
 Stiller and Meara
 Studio C
 Tenacious D
 The Tenderloins
 The Three Stooges
 Tim and Eric
 The Try Guys
 The Umbilical Brothers
 Upright Citizens Brigade
 The Valleyfolk
 Wayne and Shuster
 Wheeler and Woolsey
 The Whitest Kids U' Know

Comedy writers
(sorted alphabetically by surname)

 Douglas Adams (1952–2011)
 Fred Allen (1894–1956)
 Woody Allen (born 1935)
 Chesney and Wolfe
 Roy Clarke (born 1930)
 Dick Clement (born 1937)
 David Croft (1922–2011)
 Barry Cryer
 Esmonde and Larbey
 Galton and Simpson
 W. S. Gilbert
 Willis Hall
 Antony Jay
 Carla Lane
 Ian La Frenais (born 1937)
 Graham Linehan and Arthur Mathews
 Jeremy Lloyd
 David Nobbs
 Simon Nye
 Frank Muir
 Denis Norden
 S. J. Perelman
 Jimmy Perry
 David Renwick
 Jack Rosenthal
 David Sedaris
 Gerardo Sofovich (1937–2015)
 Hugo Sofovich (1939–2003)
 Johnny Speight
 John Sullivan
 James Thurber
 Peter Tinniswood
 Zoë Tomalin
 Keith Waterhouse

See also

Lists of comedians by nationality

List of Australian comedians
List of British comedians
List of Canadian comedians
List of Dutch comedians
List of Finnish comedians
List of German comedians
List of Indian comedians
List of Italian comedians
List of Japanese comedians
List of Mexican comedians
List of Norwegian comedians
List of Portuguese comedians
List of Puerto Rican comedians
List of United States stand-up comedians

Other related lists
List of comedy films
List of deadpan comedians
List of humorists
List of musical comedians
List of New York Improv comedians
List of stand-up comedians

Anglophone